

186001–186100 

|-bgcolor=#E9E9E9
| 186001 ||  || — || August 16, 2001 || Socorro || LINEAR || — || align=right | 2.4 km || 
|-id=002 bgcolor=#fefefe
| 186002 ||  || — || August 16, 2001 || Socorro || LINEAR || NYS || align=right data-sort-value="0.94" | 940 m || 
|-id=003 bgcolor=#fefefe
| 186003 ||  || — || August 16, 2001 || Socorro || LINEAR || — || align=right | 1.1 km || 
|-id=004 bgcolor=#fefefe
| 186004 ||  || — || August 16, 2001 || Socorro || LINEAR || NYS || align=right | 1.1 km || 
|-id=005 bgcolor=#E9E9E9
| 186005 ||  || — || August 16, 2001 || Socorro || LINEAR || — || align=right | 1.6 km || 
|-id=006 bgcolor=#fefefe
| 186006 ||  || — || August 18, 2001 || Socorro || LINEAR || NYS || align=right data-sort-value="0.96" | 960 m || 
|-id=007 bgcolor=#fefefe
| 186007 Guilleminet ||  ||  || August 18, 2001 || Pises || Pises Obs. || MAS || align=right data-sort-value="0.93" | 930 m || 
|-id=008 bgcolor=#fefefe
| 186008 ||  || — || August 19, 2001 || Socorro || LINEAR || — || align=right | 1.1 km || 
|-id=009 bgcolor=#E9E9E9
| 186009 ||  || — || August 24, 2001 || Socorro || LINEAR || — || align=right | 2.4 km || 
|-id=010 bgcolor=#E9E9E9
| 186010 ||  || — || August 25, 2001 || Socorro || LINEAR || KON || align=right | 3.9 km || 
|-id=011 bgcolor=#E9E9E9
| 186011 ||  || — || August 17, 2001 || Socorro || LINEAR || — || align=right | 1.3 km || 
|-id=012 bgcolor=#fefefe
| 186012 ||  || — || August 19, 2001 || Socorro || LINEAR || — || align=right | 1.3 km || 
|-id=013 bgcolor=#E9E9E9
| 186013 ||  || — || August 19, 2001 || Socorro || LINEAR || — || align=right | 1.6 km || 
|-id=014 bgcolor=#fefefe
| 186014 ||  || — || August 20, 2001 || Socorro || LINEAR || — || align=right | 1.7 km || 
|-id=015 bgcolor=#E9E9E9
| 186015 ||  || — || August 20, 2001 || Socorro || LINEAR || RAF || align=right | 1.3 km || 
|-id=016 bgcolor=#E9E9E9
| 186016 ||  || — || August 20, 2001 || Palomar || NEAT || MAR || align=right | 1.5 km || 
|-id=017 bgcolor=#E9E9E9
| 186017 ||  || — || August 23, 2001 || Socorro || LINEAR || BRU || align=right | 4.7 km || 
|-id=018 bgcolor=#fefefe
| 186018 ||  || — || August 23, 2001 || Anderson Mesa || LONEOS || NYS || align=right data-sort-value="0.81" | 810 m || 
|-id=019 bgcolor=#fefefe
| 186019 ||  || — || August 25, 2001 || Anderson Mesa || LONEOS || NYS || align=right data-sort-value="0.99" | 990 m || 
|-id=020 bgcolor=#E9E9E9
| 186020 ||  || — || August 25, 2001 || Palomar || NEAT || — || align=right | 1.5 km || 
|-id=021 bgcolor=#fefefe
| 186021 ||  || — || August 21, 2001 || Kitt Peak || Spacewatch || MAS || align=right data-sort-value="0.82" | 820 m || 
|-id=022 bgcolor=#fefefe
| 186022 ||  || — || August 22, 2001 || Haleakala || NEAT || NYS || align=right data-sort-value="0.96" | 960 m || 
|-id=023 bgcolor=#E9E9E9
| 186023 ||  || — || August 22, 2001 || Kitt Peak || Spacewatch || HNS || align=right | 2.2 km || 
|-id=024 bgcolor=#d6d6d6
| 186024 ||  || — || August 23, 2001 || Anderson Mesa || LONEOS || 4:3 || align=right | 6.9 km || 
|-id=025 bgcolor=#E9E9E9
| 186025 ||  || — || August 23, 2001 || Anderson Mesa || LONEOS || — || align=right | 1.3 km || 
|-id=026 bgcolor=#E9E9E9
| 186026 ||  || — || August 24, 2001 || Anderson Mesa || LONEOS || — || align=right | 2.8 km || 
|-id=027 bgcolor=#E9E9E9
| 186027 ||  || — || August 24, 2001 || Socorro || LINEAR || — || align=right | 1.3 km || 
|-id=028 bgcolor=#fefefe
| 186028 ||  || — || August 25, 2001 || Anderson Mesa || LONEOS || — || align=right | 1.1 km || 
|-id=029 bgcolor=#fefefe
| 186029 ||  || — || August 19, 2001 || Socorro || LINEAR || — || align=right | 1.4 km || 
|-id=030 bgcolor=#fefefe
| 186030 ||  || — || August 23, 2001 || Haleakala || NEAT || — || align=right | 1.6 km || 
|-id=031 bgcolor=#d6d6d6
| 186031 ||  || — || August 28, 2001 || Palomar || NEAT || — || align=right | 5.0 km || 
|-id=032 bgcolor=#E9E9E9
| 186032 ||  || — || September 8, 2001 || Socorro || LINEAR || MAR || align=right | 2.1 km || 
|-id=033 bgcolor=#E9E9E9
| 186033 ||  || — || September 9, 2001 || Palomar || NEAT || — || align=right | 2.8 km || 
|-id=034 bgcolor=#E9E9E9
| 186034 ||  || — || September 10, 2001 || Socorro || LINEAR || MAR || align=right | 1.6 km || 
|-id=035 bgcolor=#E9E9E9
| 186035 ||  || — || September 13, 2001 || Palomar || NEAT || RAF || align=right | 1.6 km || 
|-id=036 bgcolor=#fefefe
| 186036 ||  || — || September 11, 2001 || Anderson Mesa || LONEOS || — || align=right | 1.2 km || 
|-id=037 bgcolor=#fefefe
| 186037 ||  || — || September 12, 2001 || Socorro || LINEAR || — || align=right | 1.2 km || 
|-id=038 bgcolor=#fefefe
| 186038 ||  || — || September 12, 2001 || Socorro || LINEAR || NYS || align=right data-sort-value="0.91" | 910 m || 
|-id=039 bgcolor=#d6d6d6
| 186039 ||  || — || September 12, 2001 || Socorro || LINEAR || — || align=right | 3.2 km || 
|-id=040 bgcolor=#E9E9E9
| 186040 ||  || — || September 12, 2001 || Socorro || LINEAR || — || align=right | 3.8 km || 
|-id=041 bgcolor=#E9E9E9
| 186041 ||  || — || September 12, 2001 || Socorro || LINEAR || — || align=right | 1.4 km || 
|-id=042 bgcolor=#E9E9E9
| 186042 ||  || — || September 12, 2001 || Socorro || LINEAR || — || align=right | 1.1 km || 
|-id=043 bgcolor=#fefefe
| 186043 ||  || — || September 17, 2001 || Desert Eagle || W. K. Y. Yeung || — || align=right | 2.2 km || 
|-id=044 bgcolor=#E9E9E9
| 186044 ||  || — || September 17, 2001 || Desert Eagle || W. K. Y. Yeung || EUN || align=right | 2.2 km || 
|-id=045 bgcolor=#E9E9E9
| 186045 ||  || — || September 16, 2001 || Socorro || LINEAR || MAR || align=right | 1.5 km || 
|-id=046 bgcolor=#E9E9E9
| 186046 ||  || — || September 16, 2001 || Socorro || LINEAR || — || align=right | 2.1 km || 
|-id=047 bgcolor=#fefefe
| 186047 ||  || — || September 16, 2001 || Socorro || LINEAR || MAS || align=right | 1.1 km || 
|-id=048 bgcolor=#E9E9E9
| 186048 ||  || — || September 16, 2001 || Socorro || LINEAR || — || align=right | 5.5 km || 
|-id=049 bgcolor=#fefefe
| 186049 ||  || — || September 16, 2001 || Socorro || LINEAR || NYS || align=right | 1.0 km || 
|-id=050 bgcolor=#E9E9E9
| 186050 ||  || — || September 16, 2001 || Socorro || LINEAR || DOR || align=right | 5.0 km || 
|-id=051 bgcolor=#E9E9E9
| 186051 ||  || — || September 16, 2001 || Socorro || LINEAR || — || align=right | 3.0 km || 
|-id=052 bgcolor=#fefefe
| 186052 ||  || — || September 16, 2001 || Socorro || LINEAR || — || align=right | 1.7 km || 
|-id=053 bgcolor=#E9E9E9
| 186053 ||  || — || September 16, 2001 || Socorro || LINEAR || — || align=right | 1.3 km || 
|-id=054 bgcolor=#E9E9E9
| 186054 ||  || — || September 16, 2001 || Socorro || LINEAR || — || align=right | 1.6 km || 
|-id=055 bgcolor=#E9E9E9
| 186055 ||  || — || September 17, 2001 || Socorro || LINEAR || — || align=right | 2.7 km || 
|-id=056 bgcolor=#E9E9E9
| 186056 ||  || — || September 17, 2001 || Socorro || LINEAR || JUN || align=right | 1.5 km || 
|-id=057 bgcolor=#E9E9E9
| 186057 ||  || — || September 17, 2001 || Socorro || LINEAR || — || align=right | 2.4 km || 
|-id=058 bgcolor=#E9E9E9
| 186058 ||  || — || September 20, 2001 || Socorro || LINEAR || — || align=right | 3.9 km || 
|-id=059 bgcolor=#fefefe
| 186059 ||  || — || September 16, 2001 || Socorro || LINEAR || — || align=right | 1.3 km || 
|-id=060 bgcolor=#E9E9E9
| 186060 ||  || — || September 16, 2001 || Socorro || LINEAR || — || align=right | 2.6 km || 
|-id=061 bgcolor=#E9E9E9
| 186061 ||  || — || September 16, 2001 || Socorro || LINEAR || — || align=right | 2.5 km || 
|-id=062 bgcolor=#E9E9E9
| 186062 ||  || — || September 17, 2001 || Socorro || LINEAR || — || align=right | 3.2 km || 
|-id=063 bgcolor=#fefefe
| 186063 ||  || — || September 19, 2001 || Socorro || LINEAR || NYS || align=right data-sort-value="0.96" | 960 m || 
|-id=064 bgcolor=#d6d6d6
| 186064 ||  || — || September 19, 2001 || Socorro || LINEAR || — || align=right | 4.2 km || 
|-id=065 bgcolor=#E9E9E9
| 186065 ||  || — || September 19, 2001 || Socorro || LINEAR || — || align=right | 2.2 km || 
|-id=066 bgcolor=#E9E9E9
| 186066 ||  || — || September 16, 2001 || Socorro || LINEAR || — || align=right | 1.3 km || 
|-id=067 bgcolor=#E9E9E9
| 186067 ||  || — || September 16, 2001 || Socorro || LINEAR || ADE || align=right | 4.3 km || 
|-id=068 bgcolor=#fefefe
| 186068 ||  || — || September 16, 2001 || Socorro || LINEAR || — || align=right | 1.6 km || 
|-id=069 bgcolor=#E9E9E9
| 186069 ||  || — || September 16, 2001 || Socorro || LINEAR || EUN || align=right | 1.5 km || 
|-id=070 bgcolor=#E9E9E9
| 186070 ||  || — || September 19, 2001 || Socorro || LINEAR || — || align=right | 1.8 km || 
|-id=071 bgcolor=#E9E9E9
| 186071 ||  || — || September 19, 2001 || Socorro || LINEAR || EUN || align=right | 1.4 km || 
|-id=072 bgcolor=#E9E9E9
| 186072 ||  || — || September 19, 2001 || Socorro || LINEAR || — || align=right | 1.3 km || 
|-id=073 bgcolor=#E9E9E9
| 186073 ||  || — || September 19, 2001 || Socorro || LINEAR || — || align=right | 1.3 km || 
|-id=074 bgcolor=#E9E9E9
| 186074 ||  || — || September 19, 2001 || Socorro || LINEAR || — || align=right | 1.2 km || 
|-id=075 bgcolor=#fefefe
| 186075 ||  || — || September 19, 2001 || Socorro || LINEAR || — || align=right | 1.0 km || 
|-id=076 bgcolor=#E9E9E9
| 186076 ||  || — || September 19, 2001 || Socorro || LINEAR || — || align=right | 3.2 km || 
|-id=077 bgcolor=#E9E9E9
| 186077 ||  || — || September 19, 2001 || Socorro || LINEAR || — || align=right | 2.0 km || 
|-id=078 bgcolor=#E9E9E9
| 186078 ||  || — || September 19, 2001 || Socorro || LINEAR || — || align=right | 1.1 km || 
|-id=079 bgcolor=#E9E9E9
| 186079 ||  || — || September 19, 2001 || Socorro || LINEAR || — || align=right | 2.1 km || 
|-id=080 bgcolor=#E9E9E9
| 186080 ||  || — || September 19, 2001 || Socorro || LINEAR || — || align=right | 1.2 km || 
|-id=081 bgcolor=#E9E9E9
| 186081 ||  || — || September 19, 2001 || Socorro || LINEAR || — || align=right | 3.9 km || 
|-id=082 bgcolor=#E9E9E9
| 186082 ||  || — || September 19, 2001 || Socorro || LINEAR || — || align=right | 3.0 km || 
|-id=083 bgcolor=#E9E9E9
| 186083 ||  || — || September 19, 2001 || Socorro || LINEAR || — || align=right | 2.3 km || 
|-id=084 bgcolor=#E9E9E9
| 186084 ||  || — || September 19, 2001 || Socorro || LINEAR || — || align=right | 1.1 km || 
|-id=085 bgcolor=#E9E9E9
| 186085 ||  || — || September 19, 2001 || Socorro || LINEAR || — || align=right | 3.2 km || 
|-id=086 bgcolor=#E9E9E9
| 186086 ||  || — || September 20, 2001 || Socorro || LINEAR || — || align=right | 1.3 km || 
|-id=087 bgcolor=#fefefe
| 186087 ||  || — || September 20, 2001 || Socorro || LINEAR || MAS || align=right | 1.2 km || 
|-id=088 bgcolor=#E9E9E9
| 186088 ||  || — || September 21, 2001 || Palomar || NEAT || INO || align=right | 2.1 km || 
|-id=089 bgcolor=#E9E9E9
| 186089 ||  || — || September 28, 2001 || Palomar || NEAT || GER || align=right | 2.6 km || 
|-id=090 bgcolor=#d6d6d6
| 186090 ||  || — || September 19, 2001 || Socorro || LINEAR || — || align=right | 3.4 km || 
|-id=091 bgcolor=#E9E9E9
| 186091 ||  || — || September 20, 2001 || Socorro || LINEAR || — || align=right | 3.6 km || 
|-id=092 bgcolor=#E9E9E9
| 186092 ||  || — || September 20, 2001 || Socorro || LINEAR || — || align=right | 1.3 km || 
|-id=093 bgcolor=#E9E9E9
| 186093 ||  || — || September 21, 2001 || Socorro || LINEAR || — || align=right | 1.6 km || 
|-id=094 bgcolor=#E9E9E9
| 186094 ||  || — || September 20, 2001 || Socorro || LINEAR || — || align=right | 1.5 km || 
|-id=095 bgcolor=#fefefe
| 186095 ||  || — || September 23, 2001 || Palomar || NEAT || — || align=right | 1.8 km || 
|-id=096 bgcolor=#E9E9E9
| 186096 ||  || — || September 25, 2001 || Socorro || LINEAR || — || align=right | 2.1 km || 
|-id=097 bgcolor=#E9E9E9
| 186097 ||  || — || September 18, 2001 || Anderson Mesa || LONEOS || — || align=right | 1.8 km || 
|-id=098 bgcolor=#E9E9E9
| 186098 ||  || — || October 6, 2001 || Palomar || NEAT || — || align=right | 3.2 km || 
|-id=099 bgcolor=#E9E9E9
| 186099 ||  || — || October 13, 2001 || Uenohara || Uenohara Obs. || — || align=right | 1.3 km || 
|-id=100 bgcolor=#E9E9E9
| 186100 ||  || — || October 14, 2001 || Socorro || LINEAR || — || align=right | 1.4 km || 
|}

186101–186200 

|-bgcolor=#E9E9E9
| 186101 ||  || — || October 14, 2001 || Socorro || LINEAR || — || align=right | 2.5 km || 
|-id=102 bgcolor=#E9E9E9
| 186102 ||  || — || October 14, 2001 || Socorro || LINEAR || — || align=right | 4.5 km || 
|-id=103 bgcolor=#E9E9E9
| 186103 ||  || — || October 14, 2001 || Socorro || LINEAR || BAR || align=right | 2.2 km || 
|-id=104 bgcolor=#fefefe
| 186104 ||  || — || October 15, 2001 || Socorro || LINEAR || H || align=right | 1.5 km || 
|-id=105 bgcolor=#E9E9E9
| 186105 ||  || — || October 13, 2001 || Socorro || LINEAR || — || align=right | 4.1 km || 
|-id=106 bgcolor=#C2FFFF
| 186106 ||  || — || October 14, 2001 || Socorro || LINEAR || L5 || align=right | 12 km || 
|-id=107 bgcolor=#E9E9E9
| 186107 ||  || — || October 13, 2001 || Socorro || LINEAR || — || align=right | 3.6 km || 
|-id=108 bgcolor=#E9E9E9
| 186108 ||  || — || October 13, 2001 || Socorro || LINEAR || DOR || align=right | 4.3 km || 
|-id=109 bgcolor=#E9E9E9
| 186109 ||  || — || October 13, 2001 || Socorro || LINEAR || — || align=right | 5.7 km || 
|-id=110 bgcolor=#E9E9E9
| 186110 ||  || — || October 14, 2001 || Socorro || LINEAR || — || align=right | 2.9 km || 
|-id=111 bgcolor=#E9E9E9
| 186111 ||  || — || October 14, 2001 || Socorro || LINEAR || — || align=right | 3.4 km || 
|-id=112 bgcolor=#E9E9E9
| 186112 ||  || — || October 14, 2001 || Socorro || LINEAR || — || align=right | 1.2 km || 
|-id=113 bgcolor=#E9E9E9
| 186113 ||  || — || October 14, 2001 || Socorro || LINEAR || — || align=right | 2.8 km || 
|-id=114 bgcolor=#d6d6d6
| 186114 ||  || — || October 14, 2001 || Socorro || LINEAR || — || align=right | 5.4 km || 
|-id=115 bgcolor=#E9E9E9
| 186115 ||  || — || October 14, 2001 || Socorro || LINEAR || — || align=right | 2.1 km || 
|-id=116 bgcolor=#E9E9E9
| 186116 ||  || — || October 13, 2001 || Kitt Peak || Spacewatch || — || align=right | 2.3 km || 
|-id=117 bgcolor=#E9E9E9
| 186117 ||  || — || October 10, 2001 || Palomar || NEAT || — || align=right | 2.5 km || 
|-id=118 bgcolor=#E9E9E9
| 186118 ||  || — || October 10, 2001 || Palomar || NEAT || — || align=right | 2.8 km || 
|-id=119 bgcolor=#fefefe
| 186119 ||  || — || October 10, 2001 || Palomar || NEAT || — || align=right | 1.2 km || 
|-id=120 bgcolor=#E9E9E9
| 186120 ||  || — || October 10, 2001 || Palomar || NEAT || — || align=right | 1.3 km || 
|-id=121 bgcolor=#E9E9E9
| 186121 ||  || — || October 10, 2001 || Palomar || NEAT || DOR || align=right | 3.4 km || 
|-id=122 bgcolor=#E9E9E9
| 186122 ||  || — || October 10, 2001 || Palomar || NEAT || — || align=right | 1.6 km || 
|-id=123 bgcolor=#E9E9E9
| 186123 ||  || — || October 10, 2001 || Palomar || NEAT || — || align=right | 1.5 km || 
|-id=124 bgcolor=#E9E9E9
| 186124 ||  || — || October 10, 2001 || Palomar || NEAT || — || align=right | 2.3 km || 
|-id=125 bgcolor=#C2FFFF
| 186125 ||  || — || October 10, 2001 || Palomar || NEAT || L5 || align=right | 15 km || 
|-id=126 bgcolor=#E9E9E9
| 186126 ||  || — || October 10, 2001 || Palomar || NEAT || — || align=right | 2.4 km || 
|-id=127 bgcolor=#E9E9E9
| 186127 ||  || — || October 10, 2001 || Palomar || NEAT || — || align=right | 1.5 km || 
|-id=128 bgcolor=#C2FFFF
| 186128 ||  || — || October 15, 2001 || Palomar || NEAT || L5 || align=right | 14 km || 
|-id=129 bgcolor=#E9E9E9
| 186129 ||  || — || October 11, 2001 || Palomar || NEAT || — || align=right | 1.9 km || 
|-id=130 bgcolor=#d6d6d6
| 186130 ||  || — || October 11, 2001 || Palomar || NEAT || TRP || align=right | 2.7 km || 
|-id=131 bgcolor=#E9E9E9
| 186131 ||  || — || October 11, 2001 || Palomar || NEAT || — || align=right | 2.2 km || 
|-id=132 bgcolor=#E9E9E9
| 186132 ||  || — || October 15, 2001 || Haleakala || NEAT || — || align=right | 3.2 km || 
|-id=133 bgcolor=#E9E9E9
| 186133 ||  || — || October 15, 2001 || Palomar || NEAT || ADE || align=right | 3.6 km || 
|-id=134 bgcolor=#E9E9E9
| 186134 ||  || — || October 15, 2001 || Palomar || NEAT || RAF || align=right | 1.5 km || 
|-id=135 bgcolor=#E9E9E9
| 186135 ||  || — || October 14, 2001 || Socorro || LINEAR || — || align=right | 4.1 km || 
|-id=136 bgcolor=#E9E9E9
| 186136 ||  || — || October 14, 2001 || Palomar || NEAT || — || align=right | 2.8 km || 
|-id=137 bgcolor=#E9E9E9
| 186137 ||  || — || October 11, 2001 || Socorro || LINEAR || — || align=right | 2.6 km || 
|-id=138 bgcolor=#C2FFFF
| 186138 ||  || — || October 11, 2001 || Palomar || NEAT || L5 || align=right | 12 km || 
|-id=139 bgcolor=#E9E9E9
| 186139 ||  || — || October 11, 2001 || Palomar || NEAT || — || align=right | 1.8 km || 
|-id=140 bgcolor=#E9E9E9
| 186140 ||  || — || October 13, 2001 || Palomar || NEAT || — || align=right | 2.3 km || 
|-id=141 bgcolor=#E9E9E9
| 186141 ||  || — || October 14, 2001 || Socorro || LINEAR || — || align=right | 1.9 km || 
|-id=142 bgcolor=#E9E9E9
| 186142 Gillespie ||  ||  || October 14, 2001 || Apache Point || SDSS || — || align=right | 2.5 km || 
|-id=143 bgcolor=#E9E9E9
| 186143 ||  || — || October 15, 2001 || Kitt Peak || Spacewatch || — || align=right | 1.9 km || 
|-id=144 bgcolor=#E9E9E9
| 186144 ||  || — || October 17, 2001 || Socorro || LINEAR || GEF || align=right | 2.0 km || 
|-id=145 bgcolor=#E9E9E9
| 186145 ||  || — || October 21, 2001 || Desert Eagle || W. K. Y. Yeung || — || align=right | 2.7 km || 
|-id=146 bgcolor=#E9E9E9
| 186146 ||  || — || October 17, 2001 || Kitt Peak || Spacewatch || — || align=right | 1.0 km || 
|-id=147 bgcolor=#E9E9E9
| 186147 ||  || — || October 17, 2001 || Palomar || NEAT || HEN || align=right | 1.4 km || 
|-id=148 bgcolor=#E9E9E9
| 186148 ||  || — || October 16, 2001 || Socorro || LINEAR || — || align=right | 2.6 km || 
|-id=149 bgcolor=#E9E9E9
| 186149 ||  || — || October 16, 2001 || Socorro || LINEAR || — || align=right | 4.3 km || 
|-id=150 bgcolor=#E9E9E9
| 186150 ||  || — || October 17, 2001 || Socorro || LINEAR || HEN || align=right | 1.4 km || 
|-id=151 bgcolor=#E9E9E9
| 186151 ||  || — || October 17, 2001 || Socorro || LINEAR || — || align=right | 1.3 km || 
|-id=152 bgcolor=#E9E9E9
| 186152 ||  || — || October 17, 2001 || Socorro || LINEAR || HEN || align=right | 1.5 km || 
|-id=153 bgcolor=#fefefe
| 186153 ||  || — || October 18, 2001 || Socorro || LINEAR || H || align=right | 1.6 km || 
|-id=154 bgcolor=#E9E9E9
| 186154 ||  || — || October 17, 2001 || Socorro || LINEAR || — || align=right | 4.0 km || 
|-id=155 bgcolor=#E9E9E9
| 186155 ||  || — || October 20, 2001 || Socorro || LINEAR || — || align=right | 2.0 km || 
|-id=156 bgcolor=#E9E9E9
| 186156 ||  || — || October 20, 2001 || Socorro || LINEAR || — || align=right | 2.5 km || 
|-id=157 bgcolor=#E9E9E9
| 186157 ||  || — || October 20, 2001 || Socorro || LINEAR || NEM || align=right | 3.0 km || 
|-id=158 bgcolor=#E9E9E9
| 186158 ||  || — || October 20, 2001 || Socorro || LINEAR || KON || align=right | 2.9 km || 
|-id=159 bgcolor=#E9E9E9
| 186159 ||  || — || October 21, 2001 || Socorro || LINEAR || PAD || align=right | 1.9 km || 
|-id=160 bgcolor=#E9E9E9
| 186160 ||  || — || October 22, 2001 || Socorro || LINEAR || — || align=right | 2.0 km || 
|-id=161 bgcolor=#E9E9E9
| 186161 ||  || — || October 22, 2001 || Socorro || LINEAR || — || align=right | 2.0 km || 
|-id=162 bgcolor=#E9E9E9
| 186162 ||  || — || October 20, 2001 || Socorro || LINEAR || — || align=right | 2.8 km || 
|-id=163 bgcolor=#E9E9E9
| 186163 ||  || — || October 21, 2001 || Socorro || LINEAR || — || align=right | 3.3 km || 
|-id=164 bgcolor=#E9E9E9
| 186164 ||  || — || October 21, 2001 || Socorro || LINEAR || — || align=right | 1.7 km || 
|-id=165 bgcolor=#E9E9E9
| 186165 ||  || — || October 21, 2001 || Socorro || LINEAR || HNS || align=right | 1.6 km || 
|-id=166 bgcolor=#d6d6d6
| 186166 ||  || — || October 23, 2001 || Socorro || LINEAR || — || align=right | 2.9 km || 
|-id=167 bgcolor=#E9E9E9
| 186167 ||  || — || October 23, 2001 || Socorro || LINEAR || — || align=right | 1.8 km || 
|-id=168 bgcolor=#E9E9E9
| 186168 ||  || — || October 23, 2001 || Socorro || LINEAR || — || align=right | 1.5 km || 
|-id=169 bgcolor=#E9E9E9
| 186169 ||  || — || October 23, 2001 || Socorro || LINEAR || — || align=right | 1.6 km || 
|-id=170 bgcolor=#d6d6d6
| 186170 ||  || — || October 23, 2001 || Socorro || LINEAR || — || align=right | 4.3 km || 
|-id=171 bgcolor=#E9E9E9
| 186171 ||  || — || October 23, 2001 || Socorro || LINEAR || — || align=right | 1.5 km || 
|-id=172 bgcolor=#E9E9E9
| 186172 ||  || — || October 23, 2001 || Socorro || LINEAR || — || align=right | 1.6 km || 
|-id=173 bgcolor=#E9E9E9
| 186173 ||  || — || October 23, 2001 || Socorro || LINEAR || — || align=right | 3.0 km || 
|-id=174 bgcolor=#E9E9E9
| 186174 ||  || — || October 23, 2001 || Palomar || NEAT || — || align=right | 1.4 km || 
|-id=175 bgcolor=#E9E9E9
| 186175 ||  || — || October 24, 2001 || Kitt Peak || Spacewatch || — || align=right | 1.9 km || 
|-id=176 bgcolor=#E9E9E9
| 186176 ||  || — || October 18, 2001 || Palomar || NEAT || — || align=right | 2.2 km || 
|-id=177 bgcolor=#E9E9E9
| 186177 ||  || — || October 24, 2001 || Palomar || NEAT || — || align=right | 1.6 km || 
|-id=178 bgcolor=#E9E9E9
| 186178 ||  || — || October 16, 2001 || Palomar || NEAT || — || align=right | 1.2 km || 
|-id=179 bgcolor=#E9E9E9
| 186179 ||  || — || October 19, 2001 || Anderson Mesa || LONEOS || — || align=right | 4.1 km || 
|-id=180 bgcolor=#E9E9E9
| 186180 ||  || — || October 19, 2001 || Palomar || NEAT || — || align=right | 2.6 km || 
|-id=181 bgcolor=#E9E9E9
| 186181 ||  || — || October 19, 2001 || Palomar || NEAT || — || align=right | 2.2 km || 
|-id=182 bgcolor=#E9E9E9
| 186182 ||  || — || October 20, 2001 || Socorro || LINEAR || HEN || align=right | 1.5 km || 
|-id=183 bgcolor=#E9E9E9
| 186183 ||  || — || October 19, 2001 || Palomar || NEAT || — || align=right | 2.4 km || 
|-id=184 bgcolor=#E9E9E9
| 186184 || 2001 VT || — || November 6, 2001 || Socorro || LINEAR || — || align=right | 2.4 km || 
|-id=185 bgcolor=#E9E9E9
| 186185 ||  || — || November 9, 2001 || Socorro || LINEAR || — || align=right | 5.3 km || 
|-id=186 bgcolor=#E9E9E9
| 186186 ||  || — || November 9, 2001 || Socorro || LINEAR || MIS || align=right | 3.9 km || 
|-id=187 bgcolor=#E9E9E9
| 186187 ||  || — || November 9, 2001 || Socorro || LINEAR || — || align=right | 3.9 km || 
|-id=188 bgcolor=#E9E9E9
| 186188 ||  || — || November 9, 2001 || Socorro || LINEAR || JUN || align=right | 2.3 km || 
|-id=189 bgcolor=#E9E9E9
| 186189 ||  || — || November 10, 2001 || Socorro || LINEAR || — || align=right | 2.0 km || 
|-id=190 bgcolor=#E9E9E9
| 186190 ||  || — || November 15, 2001 || Kitt Peak || Spacewatch || — || align=right | 1.8 km || 
|-id=191 bgcolor=#E9E9E9
| 186191 ||  || — || November 15, 2001 || Socorro || LINEAR || — || align=right | 3.6 km || 
|-id=192 bgcolor=#E9E9E9
| 186192 ||  || — || November 12, 2001 || Socorro || LINEAR || — || align=right | 4.2 km || 
|-id=193 bgcolor=#E9E9E9
| 186193 ||  || — || November 15, 2001 || Socorro || LINEAR || — || align=right | 2.7 km || 
|-id=194 bgcolor=#E9E9E9
| 186194 ||  || — || November 15, 2001 || Socorro || LINEAR || MAR || align=right | 1.7 km || 
|-id=195 bgcolor=#E9E9E9
| 186195 ||  || — || November 15, 2001 || Socorro || LINEAR || — || align=right | 2.3 km || 
|-id=196 bgcolor=#E9E9E9
| 186196 ||  || — || November 15, 2001 || Socorro || LINEAR || ADE || align=right | 5.0 km || 
|-id=197 bgcolor=#E9E9E9
| 186197 ||  || — || November 12, 2001 || Socorro || LINEAR || — || align=right | 3.7 km || 
|-id=198 bgcolor=#E9E9E9
| 186198 ||  || — || November 12, 2001 || Socorro || LINEAR || HOF || align=right | 3.6 km || 
|-id=199 bgcolor=#E9E9E9
| 186199 ||  || — || November 15, 2001 || Palomar || NEAT || — || align=right | 2.0 km || 
|-id=200 bgcolor=#E9E9E9
| 186200 ||  || — || November 9, 2001 || Socorro || LINEAR || — || align=right | 2.0 km || 
|}

186201–186300 

|-bgcolor=#E9E9E9
| 186201 ||  || — || November 9, 2001 || Socorro || LINEAR || AGN || align=right | 1.8 km || 
|-id=202 bgcolor=#E9E9E9
| 186202 ||  || — || November 11, 2001 || Socorro || LINEAR || ADE || align=right | 4.2 km || 
|-id=203 bgcolor=#E9E9E9
| 186203 ||  || — || November 17, 2001 || Socorro || LINEAR || — || align=right | 3.0 km || 
|-id=204 bgcolor=#E9E9E9
| 186204 ||  || — || November 17, 2001 || Kitt Peak || Spacewatch || EUN || align=right | 2.6 km || 
|-id=205 bgcolor=#E9E9E9
| 186205 ||  || — || November 17, 2001 || Socorro || LINEAR || MAR || align=right | 1.8 km || 
|-id=206 bgcolor=#E9E9E9
| 186206 ||  || — || November 17, 2001 || Socorro || LINEAR || HEN || align=right | 1.4 km || 
|-id=207 bgcolor=#E9E9E9
| 186207 ||  || — || November 17, 2001 || Socorro || LINEAR || — || align=right | 1.5 km || 
|-id=208 bgcolor=#E9E9E9
| 186208 ||  || — || November 17, 2001 || Socorro || LINEAR || — || align=right | 2.3 km || 
|-id=209 bgcolor=#E9E9E9
| 186209 ||  || — || November 17, 2001 || Socorro || LINEAR || — || align=right | 1.2 km || 
|-id=210 bgcolor=#E9E9E9
| 186210 ||  || — || November 17, 2001 || Socorro || LINEAR || — || align=right | 3.9 km || 
|-id=211 bgcolor=#E9E9E9
| 186211 ||  || — || November 17, 2001 || Socorro || LINEAR || — || align=right | 1.4 km || 
|-id=212 bgcolor=#E9E9E9
| 186212 ||  || — || November 17, 2001 || Socorro || LINEAR || — || align=right | 4.0 km || 
|-id=213 bgcolor=#E9E9E9
| 186213 ||  || — || November 18, 2001 || Socorro || LINEAR || — || align=right | 2.2 km || 
|-id=214 bgcolor=#E9E9E9
| 186214 ||  || — || November 19, 2001 || Anderson Mesa || LONEOS || HNS || align=right | 2.0 km || 
|-id=215 bgcolor=#E9E9E9
| 186215 ||  || — || November 19, 2001 || Anderson Mesa || LONEOS || — || align=right | 3.4 km || 
|-id=216 bgcolor=#d6d6d6
| 186216 ||  || — || November 19, 2001 || Anderson Mesa || LONEOS || — || align=right | 4.5 km || 
|-id=217 bgcolor=#E9E9E9
| 186217 ||  || — || November 19, 2001 || Anderson Mesa || LONEOS || HNS || align=right | 2.0 km || 
|-id=218 bgcolor=#E9E9E9
| 186218 ||  || — || November 19, 2001 || Socorro || LINEAR || — || align=right | 2.0 km || 
|-id=219 bgcolor=#E9E9E9
| 186219 ||  || — || November 19, 2001 || Socorro || LINEAR || XIZ || align=right | 2.1 km || 
|-id=220 bgcolor=#E9E9E9
| 186220 ||  || — || November 20, 2001 || Socorro || LINEAR || — || align=right | 3.0 km || 
|-id=221 bgcolor=#E9E9E9
| 186221 ||  || — || November 20, 2001 || Socorro || LINEAR || — || align=right | 2.8 km || 
|-id=222 bgcolor=#E9E9E9
| 186222 ||  || — || November 20, 2001 || Socorro || LINEAR || WIT || align=right | 1.1 km || 
|-id=223 bgcolor=#E9E9E9
| 186223 ||  || — || November 20, 2001 || Socorro || LINEAR || — || align=right | 2.7 km || 
|-id=224 bgcolor=#E9E9E9
| 186224 ||  || — || November 19, 2001 || Socorro || LINEAR || — || align=right | 1.6 km || 
|-id=225 bgcolor=#E9E9E9
| 186225 ||  || — || November 19, 2001 || Socorro || LINEAR || WIT || align=right | 1.5 km || 
|-id=226 bgcolor=#E9E9E9
| 186226 ||  || — || November 18, 2001 || Kitt Peak || Spacewatch || NEM || align=right | 3.5 km || 
|-id=227 bgcolor=#E9E9E9
| 186227 ||  || — || December 9, 2001 || Socorro || LINEAR || — || align=right | 1.8 km || 
|-id=228 bgcolor=#E9E9E9
| 186228 ||  || — || December 9, 2001 || Socorro || LINEAR || — || align=right | 3.8 km || 
|-id=229 bgcolor=#E9E9E9
| 186229 ||  || — || December 9, 2001 || Socorro || LINEAR || JUN || align=right | 2.0 km || 
|-id=230 bgcolor=#E9E9E9
| 186230 ||  || — || December 11, 2001 || Socorro || LINEAR || — || align=right | 4.5 km || 
|-id=231 bgcolor=#d6d6d6
| 186231 ||  || — || December 11, 2001 || Socorro || LINEAR || — || align=right | 2.5 km || 
|-id=232 bgcolor=#d6d6d6
| 186232 ||  || — || December 11, 2001 || Socorro || LINEAR || BRA || align=right | 2.5 km || 
|-id=233 bgcolor=#E9E9E9
| 186233 ||  || — || December 11, 2001 || Socorro || LINEAR || — || align=right | 3.9 km || 
|-id=234 bgcolor=#E9E9E9
| 186234 ||  || — || December 10, 2001 || Socorro || LINEAR || HEN || align=right | 1.4 km || 
|-id=235 bgcolor=#fefefe
| 186235 ||  || — || December 13, 2001 || Socorro || LINEAR || H || align=right data-sort-value="0.87" | 870 m || 
|-id=236 bgcolor=#E9E9E9
| 186236 ||  || — || December 14, 2001 || Socorro || LINEAR || NEM || align=right | 2.8 km || 
|-id=237 bgcolor=#E9E9E9
| 186237 ||  || — || December 14, 2001 || Socorro || LINEAR || — || align=right | 2.6 km || 
|-id=238 bgcolor=#E9E9E9
| 186238 ||  || — || December 14, 2001 || Socorro || LINEAR || — || align=right | 3.4 km || 
|-id=239 bgcolor=#E9E9E9
| 186239 ||  || — || December 14, 2001 || Socorro || LINEAR || KAZ || align=right | 2.2 km || 
|-id=240 bgcolor=#E9E9E9
| 186240 ||  || — || December 14, 2001 || Socorro || LINEAR || — || align=right | 1.5 km || 
|-id=241 bgcolor=#E9E9E9
| 186241 ||  || — || December 14, 2001 || Socorro || LINEAR || — || align=right | 4.3 km || 
|-id=242 bgcolor=#d6d6d6
| 186242 ||  || — || December 14, 2001 || Socorro || LINEAR || KAR || align=right | 1.8 km || 
|-id=243 bgcolor=#E9E9E9
| 186243 ||  || — || December 14, 2001 || Socorro || LINEAR || — || align=right | 2.9 km || 
|-id=244 bgcolor=#E9E9E9
| 186244 ||  || — || December 14, 2001 || Socorro || LINEAR || — || align=right | 4.0 km || 
|-id=245 bgcolor=#d6d6d6
| 186245 ||  || — || December 14, 2001 || Socorro || LINEAR || — || align=right | 3.1 km || 
|-id=246 bgcolor=#d6d6d6
| 186246 ||  || — || December 14, 2001 || Socorro || LINEAR || — || align=right | 4.1 km || 
|-id=247 bgcolor=#E9E9E9
| 186247 ||  || — || December 14, 2001 || Socorro || LINEAR || — || align=right | 3.1 km || 
|-id=248 bgcolor=#E9E9E9
| 186248 ||  || — || December 11, 2001 || Socorro || LINEAR || MRX || align=right | 1.9 km || 
|-id=249 bgcolor=#E9E9E9
| 186249 ||  || — || December 11, 2001 || Socorro || LINEAR || — || align=right | 3.0 km || 
|-id=250 bgcolor=#E9E9E9
| 186250 ||  || — || December 11, 2001 || Socorro || LINEAR || — || align=right | 3.7 km || 
|-id=251 bgcolor=#d6d6d6
| 186251 ||  || — || December 15, 2001 || Socorro || LINEAR || KOR || align=right | 1.9 km || 
|-id=252 bgcolor=#E9E9E9
| 186252 ||  || — || December 15, 2001 || Socorro || LINEAR || — || align=right | 1.4 km || 
|-id=253 bgcolor=#E9E9E9
| 186253 ||  || — || December 15, 2001 || Socorro || LINEAR || AGN || align=right | 2.0 km || 
|-id=254 bgcolor=#E9E9E9
| 186254 ||  || — || December 14, 2001 || Socorro || LINEAR || — || align=right | 1.6 km || 
|-id=255 bgcolor=#E9E9E9
| 186255 ||  || — || December 14, 2001 || Socorro || LINEAR || PAD || align=right | 2.7 km || 
|-id=256 bgcolor=#E9E9E9
| 186256 ||  || — || December 14, 2001 || Socorro || LINEAR || GEF || align=right | 1.9 km || 
|-id=257 bgcolor=#E9E9E9
| 186257 ||  || — || December 23, 2001 || Kingsnake || J. V. McClusky || — || align=right | 2.4 km || 
|-id=258 bgcolor=#E9E9E9
| 186258 ||  || — || December 17, 2001 || Socorro || LINEAR || — || align=right | 3.9 km || 
|-id=259 bgcolor=#E9E9E9
| 186259 ||  || — || December 17, 2001 || Socorro || LINEAR || — || align=right | 2.1 km || 
|-id=260 bgcolor=#E9E9E9
| 186260 ||  || — || December 17, 2001 || Socorro || LINEAR || — || align=right | 2.9 km || 
|-id=261 bgcolor=#E9E9E9
| 186261 ||  || — || December 18, 2001 || Socorro || LINEAR || GEF || align=right | 2.1 km || 
|-id=262 bgcolor=#E9E9E9
| 186262 ||  || — || December 18, 2001 || Socorro || LINEAR || NEM || align=right | 3.3 km || 
|-id=263 bgcolor=#E9E9E9
| 186263 ||  || — || December 18, 2001 || Socorro || LINEAR || — || align=right | 6.0 km || 
|-id=264 bgcolor=#d6d6d6
| 186264 ||  || — || December 18, 2001 || Socorro || LINEAR || — || align=right | 4.4 km || 
|-id=265 bgcolor=#E9E9E9
| 186265 ||  || — || December 18, 2001 || Socorro || LINEAR || — || align=right | 2.9 km || 
|-id=266 bgcolor=#E9E9E9
| 186266 ||  || — || December 17, 2001 || Socorro || LINEAR || MAR || align=right | 1.8 km || 
|-id=267 bgcolor=#E9E9E9
| 186267 ||  || — || December 17, 2001 || Socorro || LINEAR || — || align=right | 3.7 km || 
|-id=268 bgcolor=#E9E9E9
| 186268 ||  || — || December 19, 2001 || Palomar || NEAT || — || align=right | 4.0 km || 
|-id=269 bgcolor=#E9E9E9
| 186269 ||  || — || December 19, 2001 || Socorro || LINEAR || GAL || align=right | 2.4 km || 
|-id=270 bgcolor=#d6d6d6
| 186270 ||  || — || December 22, 2001 || Socorro || LINEAR || — || align=right | 4.3 km || 
|-id=271 bgcolor=#d6d6d6
| 186271 ||  || — || December 20, 2001 || Kitt Peak || Spacewatch || — || align=right | 2.5 km || 
|-id=272 bgcolor=#C2FFFF
| 186272 ||  || — || December 17, 2001 || Socorro || LINEAR || L5 || align=right | 11 km || 
|-id=273 bgcolor=#d6d6d6
| 186273 ||  || — || December 19, 2001 || Palomar || NEAT || — || align=right | 4.0 km || 
|-id=274 bgcolor=#E9E9E9
| 186274 ||  || — || January 3, 2002 || Cima Ekar || ADAS || — || align=right | 2.9 km || 
|-id=275 bgcolor=#d6d6d6
| 186275 ||  || — || January 11, 2002 || Socorro || LINEAR || — || align=right | 5.9 km || 
|-id=276 bgcolor=#d6d6d6
| 186276 ||  || — || January 9, 2002 || Socorro || LINEAR || 628 || align=right | 2.7 km || 
|-id=277 bgcolor=#d6d6d6
| 186277 ||  || — || January 9, 2002 || Socorro || LINEAR || — || align=right | 5.4 km || 
|-id=278 bgcolor=#E9E9E9
| 186278 ||  || — || January 8, 2002 || Socorro || LINEAR || ADE || align=right | 3.0 km || 
|-id=279 bgcolor=#d6d6d6
| 186279 ||  || — || January 9, 2002 || Socorro || LINEAR || — || align=right | 4.2 km || 
|-id=280 bgcolor=#d6d6d6
| 186280 ||  || — || January 9, 2002 || Socorro || LINEAR || — || align=right | 3.6 km || 
|-id=281 bgcolor=#fefefe
| 186281 ||  || — || January 15, 2002 || Kingsnake || J. V. McClusky || H || align=right | 1.1 km || 
|-id=282 bgcolor=#d6d6d6
| 186282 ||  || — || January 11, 2002 || Socorro || LINEAR || — || align=right | 5.7 km || 
|-id=283 bgcolor=#d6d6d6
| 186283 ||  || — || January 14, 2002 || Socorro || LINEAR || AEG || align=right | 5.3 km || 
|-id=284 bgcolor=#d6d6d6
| 186284 ||  || — || January 13, 2002 || Socorro || LINEAR || — || align=right | 3.4 km || 
|-id=285 bgcolor=#d6d6d6
| 186285 ||  || — || January 13, 2002 || Socorro || LINEAR || — || align=right | 4.0 km || 
|-id=286 bgcolor=#d6d6d6
| 186286 ||  || — || January 14, 2002 || Socorro || LINEAR || — || align=right | 4.4 km || 
|-id=287 bgcolor=#d6d6d6
| 186287 ||  || — || January 8, 2002 || Haleakala || NEAT || — || align=right | 4.6 km || 
|-id=288 bgcolor=#d6d6d6
| 186288 ||  || — || January 18, 2002 || Anderson Mesa || LONEOS || — || align=right | 4.7 km || 
|-id=289 bgcolor=#d6d6d6
| 186289 ||  || — || January 21, 2002 || Socorro || LINEAR || — || align=right | 6.8 km || 
|-id=290 bgcolor=#E9E9E9
| 186290 ||  || — || January 23, 2002 || Socorro || LINEAR || AGN || align=right | 1.9 km || 
|-id=291 bgcolor=#d6d6d6
| 186291 ||  || — || January 19, 2002 || Anderson Mesa || LONEOS || — || align=right | 2.6 km || 
|-id=292 bgcolor=#d6d6d6
| 186292 ||  || — || February 7, 2002 || Palomar || NEAT || — || align=right | 5.6 km || 
|-id=293 bgcolor=#E9E9E9
| 186293 ||  || — || February 3, 2002 || Haleakala || NEAT || — || align=right | 2.5 km || 
|-id=294 bgcolor=#d6d6d6
| 186294 ||  || — || February 6, 2002 || Socorro || LINEAR || — || align=right | 4.1 km || 
|-id=295 bgcolor=#d6d6d6
| 186295 ||  || — || February 7, 2002 || Socorro || LINEAR || — || align=right | 3.4 km || 
|-id=296 bgcolor=#d6d6d6
| 186296 ||  || — || February 7, 2002 || Socorro || LINEAR || — || align=right | 3.7 km || 
|-id=297 bgcolor=#d6d6d6
| 186297 ||  || — || February 7, 2002 || Socorro || LINEAR || — || align=right | 3.0 km || 
|-id=298 bgcolor=#d6d6d6
| 186298 ||  || — || February 7, 2002 || Socorro || LINEAR || — || align=right | 4.8 km || 
|-id=299 bgcolor=#d6d6d6
| 186299 ||  || — || February 7, 2002 || Socorro || LINEAR || — || align=right | 4.5 km || 
|-id=300 bgcolor=#d6d6d6
| 186300 ||  || — || February 7, 2002 || Socorro || LINEAR || THM || align=right | 3.4 km || 
|}

186301–186400 

|-bgcolor=#d6d6d6
| 186301 ||  || — || February 7, 2002 || Socorro || LINEAR || — || align=right | 5.2 km || 
|-id=302 bgcolor=#d6d6d6
| 186302 ||  || — || February 14, 2002 || Needville || Needville Obs. || — || align=right | 4.4 km || 
|-id=303 bgcolor=#d6d6d6
| 186303 ||  || — || February 7, 2002 || Socorro || LINEAR || — || align=right | 4.0 km || 
|-id=304 bgcolor=#d6d6d6
| 186304 ||  || — || February 7, 2002 || Socorro || LINEAR || — || align=right | 6.7 km || 
|-id=305 bgcolor=#d6d6d6
| 186305 ||  || — || February 7, 2002 || Socorro || LINEAR || KOR || align=right | 2.2 km || 
|-id=306 bgcolor=#d6d6d6
| 186306 ||  || — || February 8, 2002 || Socorro || LINEAR || — || align=right | 4.3 km || 
|-id=307 bgcolor=#d6d6d6
| 186307 ||  || — || February 8, 2002 || Socorro || LINEAR || — || align=right | 5.0 km || 
|-id=308 bgcolor=#d6d6d6
| 186308 ||  || — || February 10, 2002 || Socorro || LINEAR || — || align=right | 2.7 km || 
|-id=309 bgcolor=#d6d6d6
| 186309 ||  || — || February 10, 2002 || Socorro || LINEAR || THM || align=right | 3.2 km || 
|-id=310 bgcolor=#d6d6d6
| 186310 ||  || — || February 10, 2002 || Socorro || LINEAR || — || align=right | 4.0 km || 
|-id=311 bgcolor=#d6d6d6
| 186311 ||  || — || February 10, 2002 || Socorro || LINEAR || EOS || align=right | 2.9 km || 
|-id=312 bgcolor=#d6d6d6
| 186312 ||  || — || February 10, 2002 || Socorro || LINEAR || — || align=right | 4.2 km || 
|-id=313 bgcolor=#d6d6d6
| 186313 ||  || — || February 10, 2002 || Socorro || LINEAR || — || align=right | 3.4 km || 
|-id=314 bgcolor=#d6d6d6
| 186314 ||  || — || February 11, 2002 || Socorro || LINEAR || — || align=right | 3.3 km || 
|-id=315 bgcolor=#d6d6d6
| 186315 ||  || — || February 10, 2002 || Kitt Peak || Spacewatch || THM || align=right | 3.2 km || 
|-id=316 bgcolor=#d6d6d6
| 186316 ||  || — || February 10, 2002 || Socorro || LINEAR || — || align=right | 3.8 km || 
|-id=317 bgcolor=#d6d6d6
| 186317 ||  || — || February 4, 2002 || Palomar || NEAT || — || align=right | 2.9 km || 
|-id=318 bgcolor=#d6d6d6
| 186318 ||  || — || February 4, 2002 || Palomar || NEAT || — || align=right | 3.6 km || 
|-id=319 bgcolor=#d6d6d6
| 186319 ||  || — || February 7, 2002 || Kitt Peak || Spacewatch || — || align=right | 4.0 km || 
|-id=320 bgcolor=#d6d6d6
| 186320 ||  || — || February 8, 2002 || Socorro || LINEAR || — || align=right | 3.9 km || 
|-id=321 bgcolor=#d6d6d6
| 186321 ||  || — || February 8, 2002 || Socorro || LINEAR || — || align=right | 5.4 km || 
|-id=322 bgcolor=#d6d6d6
| 186322 ||  || — || February 10, 2002 || Socorro || LINEAR || — || align=right | 4.2 km || 
|-id=323 bgcolor=#d6d6d6
| 186323 ||  || — || February 21, 2002 || Socorro || LINEAR || — || align=right | 4.2 km || 
|-id=324 bgcolor=#fefefe
| 186324 ||  || — || February 21, 2002 || Socorro || LINEAR || H || align=right | 1.2 km || 
|-id=325 bgcolor=#d6d6d6
| 186325 ||  || — || February 19, 2002 || Socorro || LINEAR || THB || align=right | 3.9 km || 
|-id=326 bgcolor=#d6d6d6
| 186326 ||  || — || February 22, 2002 || Palomar || NEAT || HYG || align=right | 4.8 km || 
|-id=327 bgcolor=#d6d6d6
| 186327 ||  || — || February 20, 2002 || Socorro || LINEAR || — || align=right | 5.8 km || 
|-id=328 bgcolor=#d6d6d6
| 186328 ||  || — || February 19, 2002 || Kitt Peak || Spacewatch || — || align=right | 2.9 km || 
|-id=329 bgcolor=#d6d6d6
| 186329 ||  || — || February 21, 2002 || Socorro || LINEAR || TIR || align=right | 4.1 km || 
|-id=330 bgcolor=#d6d6d6
| 186330 ||  || — || March 6, 2002 || Palomar || NEAT || — || align=right | 6.1 km || 
|-id=331 bgcolor=#d6d6d6
| 186331 ||  || — || March 9, 2002 || Socorro || LINEAR || — || align=right | 6.4 km || 
|-id=332 bgcolor=#d6d6d6
| 186332 ||  || — || March 10, 2002 || Palomar || NEAT || EOS || align=right | 3.7 km || 
|-id=333 bgcolor=#d6d6d6
| 186333 ||  || — || March 5, 2002 || Kitt Peak || Spacewatch || THM || align=right | 2.8 km || 
|-id=334 bgcolor=#d6d6d6
| 186334 ||  || — || March 9, 2002 || Palomar || NEAT || THM || align=right | 2.7 km || 
|-id=335 bgcolor=#d6d6d6
| 186335 ||  || — || March 11, 2002 || Palomar || NEAT || EOS || align=right | 3.3 km || 
|-id=336 bgcolor=#d6d6d6
| 186336 ||  || — || March 9, 2002 || Kitt Peak || Spacewatch || EMA || align=right | 5.3 km || 
|-id=337 bgcolor=#d6d6d6
| 186337 ||  || — || March 9, 2002 || Kitt Peak || Spacewatch || EOS || align=right | 2.4 km || 
|-id=338 bgcolor=#d6d6d6
| 186338 ||  || — || March 12, 2002 || Socorro || LINEAR || THM || align=right | 3.5 km || 
|-id=339 bgcolor=#d6d6d6
| 186339 ||  || — || March 12, 2002 || Socorro || LINEAR || EOS || align=right | 2.9 km || 
|-id=340 bgcolor=#d6d6d6
| 186340 ||  || — || March 13, 2002 || Socorro || LINEAR || EOS || align=right | 3.1 km || 
|-id=341 bgcolor=#d6d6d6
| 186341 ||  || — || March 13, 2002 || Socorro || LINEAR || EUP || align=right | 7.0 km || 
|-id=342 bgcolor=#d6d6d6
| 186342 ||  || — || March 10, 2002 || Haleakala || NEAT || — || align=right | 6.3 km || 
|-id=343 bgcolor=#d6d6d6
| 186343 ||  || — || March 12, 2002 || Palomar || NEAT || — || align=right | 3.7 km || 
|-id=344 bgcolor=#d6d6d6
| 186344 ||  || — || March 6, 2002 || Socorro || LINEAR || EOS || align=right | 3.1 km || 
|-id=345 bgcolor=#d6d6d6
| 186345 ||  || — || March 9, 2002 || Catalina || CSS || — || align=right | 5.1 km || 
|-id=346 bgcolor=#d6d6d6
| 186346 ||  || — || March 10, 2002 || Kitt Peak || Spacewatch || EOS || align=right | 2.4 km || 
|-id=347 bgcolor=#d6d6d6
| 186347 ||  || — || March 12, 2002 || Palomar || NEAT || — || align=right | 4.2 km || 
|-id=348 bgcolor=#d6d6d6
| 186348 ||  || — || March 12, 2002 || Palomar || NEAT || EOS || align=right | 3.9 km || 
|-id=349 bgcolor=#d6d6d6
| 186349 ||  || — || March 15, 2002 || Palomar || NEAT || — || align=right | 4.4 km || 
|-id=350 bgcolor=#d6d6d6
| 186350 ||  || — || March 6, 2002 || Palomar || NEAT || EOS || align=right | 3.4 km || 
|-id=351 bgcolor=#d6d6d6
| 186351 ||  || — || March 20, 2002 || Desert Eagle || W. K. Y. Yeung || — || align=right | 5.1 km || 
|-id=352 bgcolor=#d6d6d6
| 186352 ||  || — || March 16, 2002 || Haleakala || NEAT || — || align=right | 6.5 km || 
|-id=353 bgcolor=#d6d6d6
| 186353 ||  || — || March 18, 2002 || Haleakala || NEAT || — || align=right | 4.6 km || 
|-id=354 bgcolor=#d6d6d6
| 186354 ||  || — || March 19, 2002 || Palomar || NEAT || — || align=right | 4.2 km || 
|-id=355 bgcolor=#d6d6d6
| 186355 ||  || — || March 20, 2002 || Palomar || NEAT || — || align=right | 3.8 km || 
|-id=356 bgcolor=#d6d6d6
| 186356 ||  || — || April 5, 2002 || Palomar || NEAT || EUP || align=right | 6.0 km || 
|-id=357 bgcolor=#d6d6d6
| 186357 ||  || — || April 14, 2002 || Socorro || LINEAR || VER || align=right | 6.3 km || 
|-id=358 bgcolor=#d6d6d6
| 186358 ||  || — || April 4, 2002 || Haleakala || NEAT || — || align=right | 5.4 km || 
|-id=359 bgcolor=#d6d6d6
| 186359 ||  || — || April 4, 2002 || Palomar || NEAT || — || align=right | 4.4 km || 
|-id=360 bgcolor=#d6d6d6
| 186360 ||  || — || April 5, 2002 || Palomar || NEAT || — || align=right | 3.8 km || 
|-id=361 bgcolor=#d6d6d6
| 186361 ||  || — || April 5, 2002 || Palomar || NEAT || — || align=right | 9.1 km || 
|-id=362 bgcolor=#d6d6d6
| 186362 ||  || — || April 9, 2002 || Anderson Mesa || LONEOS || HYG || align=right | 5.4 km || 
|-id=363 bgcolor=#d6d6d6
| 186363 ||  || — || April 9, 2002 || Anderson Mesa || LONEOS || — || align=right | 7.4 km || 
|-id=364 bgcolor=#d6d6d6
| 186364 ||  || — || April 9, 2002 || Kitt Peak || Spacewatch || VER || align=right | 6.3 km || 
|-id=365 bgcolor=#d6d6d6
| 186365 ||  || — || April 10, 2002 || Socorro || LINEAR || — || align=right | 6.0 km || 
|-id=366 bgcolor=#d6d6d6
| 186366 ||  || — || April 11, 2002 || Anderson Mesa || LONEOS || HYG || align=right | 5.3 km || 
|-id=367 bgcolor=#d6d6d6
| 186367 ||  || — || April 11, 2002 || Socorro || LINEAR || — || align=right | 5.8 km || 
|-id=368 bgcolor=#d6d6d6
| 186368 ||  || — || April 11, 2002 || Palomar || NEAT || — || align=right | 5.7 km || 
|-id=369 bgcolor=#d6d6d6
| 186369 ||  || — || April 11, 2002 || Anderson Mesa || LONEOS || — || align=right | 5.2 km || 
|-id=370 bgcolor=#d6d6d6
| 186370 ||  || — || April 10, 2002 || Socorro || LINEAR || — || align=right | 5.7 km || 
|-id=371 bgcolor=#d6d6d6
| 186371 ||  || — || April 12, 2002 || Socorro || LINEAR || — || align=right | 5.8 km || 
|-id=372 bgcolor=#d6d6d6
| 186372 ||  || — || April 12, 2002 || Socorro || LINEAR || — || align=right | 6.2 km || 
|-id=373 bgcolor=#d6d6d6
| 186373 ||  || — || April 14, 2002 || Socorro || LINEAR || HYG || align=right | 3.8 km || 
|-id=374 bgcolor=#d6d6d6
| 186374 ||  || — || April 14, 2002 || Socorro || LINEAR || EUP || align=right | 6.3 km || 
|-id=375 bgcolor=#fefefe
| 186375 ||  || — || April 14, 2002 || Palomar || NEAT || FLO || align=right data-sort-value="0.91" | 910 m || 
|-id=376 bgcolor=#d6d6d6
| 186376 ||  || — || April 14, 2002 || Palomar || NEAT || — || align=right | 5.4 km || 
|-id=377 bgcolor=#d6d6d6
| 186377 ||  || — || April 14, 2002 || Palomar || NEAT || EOS || align=right | 3.6 km || 
|-id=378 bgcolor=#d6d6d6
| 186378 ||  || — || April 10, 2002 || Socorro || LINEAR || ALA || align=right | 5.7 km || 
|-id=379 bgcolor=#d6d6d6
| 186379 ||  || — || April 12, 2002 || Socorro || LINEAR || — || align=right | 6.0 km || 
|-id=380 bgcolor=#d6d6d6
| 186380 ||  || — || April 17, 2002 || Socorro || LINEAR || — || align=right | 7.0 km || 
|-id=381 bgcolor=#d6d6d6
| 186381 ||  || — || April 17, 2002 || Socorro || LINEAR || — || align=right | 4.1 km || 
|-id=382 bgcolor=#d6d6d6
| 186382 ||  || — || May 5, 2002 || Socorro || LINEAR || — || align=right | 5.9 km || 
|-id=383 bgcolor=#d6d6d6
| 186383 ||  || — || May 8, 2002 || Socorro || LINEAR || — || align=right | 6.5 km || 
|-id=384 bgcolor=#d6d6d6
| 186384 ||  || — || May 11, 2002 || Socorro || LINEAR || VER || align=right | 5.5 km || 
|-id=385 bgcolor=#d6d6d6
| 186385 ||  || — || May 13, 2002 || Palomar || NEAT || URS || align=right | 5.5 km || 
|-id=386 bgcolor=#d6d6d6
| 186386 ||  || — || May 14, 2002 || Palomar || NEAT || — || align=right | 7.4 km || 
|-id=387 bgcolor=#d6d6d6
| 186387 ||  || — || May 14, 2002 || Palomar || NEAT || — || align=right | 5.6 km || 
|-id=388 bgcolor=#d6d6d6
| 186388 ||  || — || May 5, 2002 || Palomar || NEAT || — || align=right | 5.6 km || 
|-id=389 bgcolor=#d6d6d6
| 186389 ||  || — || May 4, 2002 || Palomar || NEAT || LUT || align=right | 7.5 km || 
|-id=390 bgcolor=#d6d6d6
| 186390 ||  || — || May 4, 2002 || Palomar || NEAT || ALA || align=right | 7.2 km || 
|-id=391 bgcolor=#fefefe
| 186391 ||  || — || June 6, 2002 || Socorro || LINEAR || — || align=right data-sort-value="0.97" | 970 m || 
|-id=392 bgcolor=#fefefe
| 186392 ||  || — || July 9, 2002 || Socorro || LINEAR || — || align=right | 1.4 km || 
|-id=393 bgcolor=#FA8072
| 186393 ||  || — || July 14, 2002 || Socorro || LINEAR || — || align=right | 1.0 km || 
|-id=394 bgcolor=#fefefe
| 186394 ||  || — || July 5, 2002 || Socorro || LINEAR || — || align=right data-sort-value="0.83" | 830 m || 
|-id=395 bgcolor=#fefefe
| 186395 ||  || — || July 5, 2002 || Palomar || NEAT || — || align=right data-sort-value="0.94" | 940 m || 
|-id=396 bgcolor=#fefefe
| 186396 ||  || — || July 23, 2002 || Palomar || NEAT || — || align=right | 1.1 km || 
|-id=397 bgcolor=#fefefe
| 186397 ||  || — || August 4, 2002 || Palomar || NEAT || — || align=right | 1.1 km || 
|-id=398 bgcolor=#fefefe
| 186398 ||  || — || August 6, 2002 || Palomar || NEAT || — || align=right | 1.2 km || 
|-id=399 bgcolor=#fefefe
| 186399 ||  || — || August 5, 2002 || Socorro || LINEAR || — || align=right | 1.6 km || 
|-id=400 bgcolor=#fefefe
| 186400 ||  || — || August 9, 2002 || Socorro || LINEAR || — || align=right | 1.4 km || 
|}

186401–186500 

|-bgcolor=#fefefe
| 186401 ||  || — || August 10, 2002 || Socorro || LINEAR || FLO || align=right data-sort-value="0.97" | 970 m || 
|-id=402 bgcolor=#fefefe
| 186402 ||  || — || August 11, 2002 || Socorro || LINEAR || — || align=right | 1.4 km || 
|-id=403 bgcolor=#fefefe
| 186403 ||  || — || August 8, 2002 || Palomar || NEAT || — || align=right | 1.0 km || 
|-id=404 bgcolor=#fefefe
| 186404 ||  || — || August 6, 2002 || Palomar || NEAT || ERI || align=right | 2.3 km || 
|-id=405 bgcolor=#fefefe
| 186405 ||  || — || August 11, 2002 || Socorro || LINEAR || — || align=right | 1.3 km || 
|-id=406 bgcolor=#fefefe
| 186406 ||  || — || August 10, 2002 || Socorro || LINEAR || — || align=right | 1.9 km || 
|-id=407 bgcolor=#fefefe
| 186407 ||  || — || August 12, 2002 || Socorro || LINEAR || FLO || align=right | 2.4 km || 
|-id=408 bgcolor=#fefefe
| 186408 ||  || — || August 14, 2002 || Socorro || LINEAR || — || align=right | 1.0 km || 
|-id=409 bgcolor=#fefefe
| 186409 ||  || — || August 15, 2002 || Palomar || NEAT || V || align=right data-sort-value="0.81" | 810 m || 
|-id=410 bgcolor=#fefefe
| 186410 ||  || — || August 14, 2002 || Socorro || LINEAR || V || align=right | 1.1 km || 
|-id=411 bgcolor=#fefefe
| 186411 Margaretsimon ||  ||  || August 10, 2002 || Cerro Tololo || M. W. Buie || FLO || align=right data-sort-value="0.80" | 800 m || 
|-id=412 bgcolor=#fefefe
| 186412 ||  || — || August 8, 2002 || Palomar || S. F. Hönig || — || align=right data-sort-value="0.88" | 880 m || 
|-id=413 bgcolor=#fefefe
| 186413 ||  || — || August 29, 2002 || Palomar || R. Matson || — || align=right data-sort-value="0.95" | 950 m || 
|-id=414 bgcolor=#fefefe
| 186414 ||  || — || August 17, 2002 || Palomar || A. Lowe || — || align=right data-sort-value="0.97" | 970 m || 
|-id=415 bgcolor=#fefefe
| 186415 ||  || — || August 30, 2002 || Palomar || NEAT || V || align=right data-sort-value="0.82" | 820 m || 
|-id=416 bgcolor=#fefefe
| 186416 ||  || — || August 18, 2002 || Palomar || NEAT || NYS || align=right data-sort-value="0.94" | 940 m || 
|-id=417 bgcolor=#fefefe
| 186417 ||  || — || August 16, 2002 || Palomar || NEAT || — || align=right | 1.2 km || 
|-id=418 bgcolor=#FA8072
| 186418 || 2002 RA || — || September 1, 2002 || Anderson Mesa || LONEOS || — || align=right | 1.4 km || 
|-id=419 bgcolor=#fefefe
| 186419 ||  || — || September 4, 2002 || Anderson Mesa || LONEOS || V || align=right data-sort-value="0.90" | 900 m || 
|-id=420 bgcolor=#fefefe
| 186420 ||  || — || September 1, 2002 || Haleakala || NEAT || FLO || align=right data-sort-value="0.83" | 830 m || 
|-id=421 bgcolor=#fefefe
| 186421 ||  || — || September 2, 2002 || Kvistaberg || UDAS || — || align=right | 1.5 km || 
|-id=422 bgcolor=#fefefe
| 186422 ||  || — || September 4, 2002 || Anderson Mesa || LONEOS || — || align=right | 1.1 km || 
|-id=423 bgcolor=#fefefe
| 186423 ||  || — || September 4, 2002 || Anderson Mesa || LONEOS || NYS || align=right | 2.4 km || 
|-id=424 bgcolor=#fefefe
| 186424 ||  || — || September 4, 2002 || Anderson Mesa || LONEOS || NYS || align=right data-sort-value="0.93" | 930 m || 
|-id=425 bgcolor=#fefefe
| 186425 ||  || — || September 4, 2002 || Anderson Mesa || LONEOS || NYS || align=right | 1.8 km || 
|-id=426 bgcolor=#fefefe
| 186426 ||  || — || September 5, 2002 || Socorro || LINEAR || — || align=right | 1.2 km || 
|-id=427 bgcolor=#fefefe
| 186427 ||  || — || September 5, 2002 || Socorro || LINEAR || — || align=right | 1.2 km || 
|-id=428 bgcolor=#fefefe
| 186428 ||  || — || September 5, 2002 || Socorro || LINEAR || — || align=right | 1.5 km || 
|-id=429 bgcolor=#fefefe
| 186429 ||  || — || September 5, 2002 || Socorro || LINEAR || — || align=right | 1.1 km || 
|-id=430 bgcolor=#fefefe
| 186430 ||  || — || September 5, 2002 || Socorro || LINEAR || NYS || align=right | 1.1 km || 
|-id=431 bgcolor=#fefefe
| 186431 ||  || — || September 5, 2002 || Socorro || LINEAR || — || align=right | 1.5 km || 
|-id=432 bgcolor=#fefefe
| 186432 ||  || — || September 5, 2002 || Socorro || LINEAR || NYS || align=right | 1.1 km || 
|-id=433 bgcolor=#fefefe
| 186433 ||  || — || September 6, 2002 || Socorro || LINEAR || — || align=right | 1.4 km || 
|-id=434 bgcolor=#fefefe
| 186434 ||  || — || September 7, 2002 || Socorro || LINEAR || — || align=right | 1.6 km || 
|-id=435 bgcolor=#fefefe
| 186435 ||  || — || September 9, 2002 || Palomar || NEAT || — || align=right | 1.3 km || 
|-id=436 bgcolor=#fefefe
| 186436 ||  || — || September 12, 2002 || Goodricke-Pigott || R. A. Tucker || — || align=right | 1.5 km || 
|-id=437 bgcolor=#fefefe
| 186437 ||  || — || September 10, 2002 || Palomar || NEAT || — || align=right | 1.9 km || 
|-id=438 bgcolor=#fefefe
| 186438 ||  || — || September 13, 2002 || Anderson Mesa || LONEOS || — || align=right | 1.3 km || 
|-id=439 bgcolor=#fefefe
| 186439 ||  || — || September 14, 2002 || Palomar || NEAT || — || align=right | 1.0 km || 
|-id=440 bgcolor=#fefefe
| 186440 ||  || — || September 3, 2002 || Haleakala || NEAT || — || align=right | 1.1 km || 
|-id=441 bgcolor=#fefefe
| 186441 ||  || — || September 14, 2002 || Haleakala || NEAT || — || align=right | 1.2 km || 
|-id=442 bgcolor=#fefefe
| 186442 ||  || — || September 27, 2002 || Palomar || NEAT || — || align=right | 1.2 km || 
|-id=443 bgcolor=#fefefe
| 186443 ||  || — || September 27, 2002 || Palomar || NEAT || NYS || align=right | 1.3 km || 
|-id=444 bgcolor=#fefefe
| 186444 ||  || — || September 26, 2002 || Palomar || NEAT || V || align=right | 1.0 km || 
|-id=445 bgcolor=#fefefe
| 186445 ||  || — || September 26, 2002 || Palomar || NEAT || MAS || align=right | 1.1 km || 
|-id=446 bgcolor=#fefefe
| 186446 ||  || — || September 28, 2002 || Haleakala || NEAT || ERI || align=right | 3.1 km || 
|-id=447 bgcolor=#fefefe
| 186447 ||  || — || September 29, 2002 || Haleakala || NEAT || — || align=right | 1.5 km || 
|-id=448 bgcolor=#d6d6d6
| 186448 ||  || — || September 30, 2002 || Haleakala || NEAT || 3:2 || align=right | 7.1 km || 
|-id=449 bgcolor=#fefefe
| 186449 ||  || — || September 28, 2002 || Haleakala || NEAT || NYS || align=right | 1.1 km || 
|-id=450 bgcolor=#fefefe
| 186450 ||  || — || September 28, 2002 || Haleakala || NEAT || — || align=right | 1.4 km || 
|-id=451 bgcolor=#fefefe
| 186451 ||  || — || September 29, 2002 || Haleakala || NEAT || V || align=right | 1.3 km || 
|-id=452 bgcolor=#fefefe
| 186452 ||  || — || September 30, 2002 || Socorro || LINEAR || NYS || align=right data-sort-value="0.85" | 850 m || 
|-id=453 bgcolor=#fefefe
| 186453 ||  || — || September 17, 2002 || Palomar || NEAT || V || align=right | 1.1 km || 
|-id=454 bgcolor=#fefefe
| 186454 ||  || — || September 30, 2002 || Socorro || LINEAR || FLO || align=right | 1.2 km || 
|-id=455 bgcolor=#fefefe
| 186455 ||  || — || September 30, 2002 || Socorro || LINEAR || V || align=right | 1.2 km || 
|-id=456 bgcolor=#fefefe
| 186456 ||  || — || September 30, 2002 || Socorro || LINEAR || — || align=right | 1.5 km || 
|-id=457 bgcolor=#fefefe
| 186457 ||  || — || September 30, 2002 || Haleakala || NEAT || V || align=right | 1.0 km || 
|-id=458 bgcolor=#fefefe
| 186458 ||  || — || September 16, 2002 || Haleakala || NEAT || V || align=right | 1.0 km || 
|-id=459 bgcolor=#fefefe
| 186459 ||  || — || September 16, 2002 || Palomar || NEAT || — || align=right | 1.0 km || 
|-id=460 bgcolor=#fefefe
| 186460 ||  || — || September 30, 2002 || Haleakala || NEAT || FLO || align=right | 2.1 km || 
|-id=461 bgcolor=#fefefe
| 186461 ||  || — || October 1, 2002 || Anderson Mesa || LONEOS || — || align=right | 1.4 km || 
|-id=462 bgcolor=#fefefe
| 186462 ||  || — || October 1, 2002 || Socorro || LINEAR || ERI || align=right | 2.1 km || 
|-id=463 bgcolor=#fefefe
| 186463 ||  || — || October 1, 2002 || Socorro || LINEAR || — || align=right | 1.3 km || 
|-id=464 bgcolor=#fefefe
| 186464 ||  || — || October 1, 2002 || Socorro || LINEAR || V || align=right | 1.1 km || 
|-id=465 bgcolor=#fefefe
| 186465 ||  || — || October 2, 2002 || Socorro || LINEAR || — || align=right | 1.3 km || 
|-id=466 bgcolor=#fefefe
| 186466 ||  || — || October 2, 2002 || Socorro || LINEAR || — || align=right | 1.4 km || 
|-id=467 bgcolor=#fefefe
| 186467 ||  || — || October 2, 2002 || Socorro || LINEAR || — || align=right | 1.6 km || 
|-id=468 bgcolor=#fefefe
| 186468 ||  || — || October 2, 2002 || Socorro || LINEAR || — || align=right | 1.4 km || 
|-id=469 bgcolor=#fefefe
| 186469 ||  || — || October 2, 2002 || Socorro || LINEAR || — || align=right | 1.5 km || 
|-id=470 bgcolor=#fefefe
| 186470 ||  || — || October 2, 2002 || Socorro || LINEAR || — || align=right | 1.4 km || 
|-id=471 bgcolor=#FA8072
| 186471 ||  || — || October 2, 2002 || Socorro || LINEAR || — || align=right | 1.5 km || 
|-id=472 bgcolor=#E9E9E9
| 186472 ||  || — || October 2, 2002 || Socorro || LINEAR || — || align=right | 1.8 km || 
|-id=473 bgcolor=#fefefe
| 186473 ||  || — || October 1, 2002 || Anderson Mesa || LONEOS || V || align=right | 1.2 km || 
|-id=474 bgcolor=#fefefe
| 186474 ||  || — || October 1, 2002 || Črni Vrh || Črni Vrh || V || align=right | 1.1 km || 
|-id=475 bgcolor=#FA8072
| 186475 ||  || — || October 5, 2002 || Anderson Mesa || LONEOS || — || align=right | 1.2 km || 
|-id=476 bgcolor=#fefefe
| 186476 ||  || — || October 3, 2002 || Socorro || LINEAR || — || align=right | 1.0 km || 
|-id=477 bgcolor=#fefefe
| 186477 ||  || — || October 3, 2002 || Palomar || NEAT || NYS || align=right | 1.2 km || 
|-id=478 bgcolor=#fefefe
| 186478 ||  || — || October 1, 2002 || Anderson Mesa || LONEOS || — || align=right | 1.4 km || 
|-id=479 bgcolor=#fefefe
| 186479 ||  || — || October 1, 2002 || Socorro || LINEAR || V || align=right | 1.2 km || 
|-id=480 bgcolor=#fefefe
| 186480 ||  || — || October 2, 2002 || Haleakala || NEAT || — || align=right | 2.9 km || 
|-id=481 bgcolor=#fefefe
| 186481 ||  || — || October 3, 2002 || Socorro || LINEAR || V || align=right data-sort-value="0.87" | 870 m || 
|-id=482 bgcolor=#fefefe
| 186482 ||  || — || October 1, 2002 || Anderson Mesa || LONEOS || — || align=right | 1.1 km || 
|-id=483 bgcolor=#fefefe
| 186483 ||  || — || October 1, 2002 || Haleakala || NEAT || — || align=right | 1.3 km || 
|-id=484 bgcolor=#fefefe
| 186484 ||  || — || October 1, 2002 || Črni Vrh || Črni Vrh || V || align=right | 1.2 km || 
|-id=485 bgcolor=#fefefe
| 186485 ||  || — || October 4, 2002 || Socorro || LINEAR || — || align=right | 1.5 km || 
|-id=486 bgcolor=#E9E9E9
| 186486 ||  || — || October 4, 2002 || Palomar || NEAT || HNS || align=right | 2.0 km || 
|-id=487 bgcolor=#fefefe
| 186487 ||  || — || October 3, 2002 || Socorro || LINEAR || FLO || align=right | 1.3 km || 
|-id=488 bgcolor=#fefefe
| 186488 ||  || — || October 3, 2002 || Socorro || LINEAR || — || align=right | 1.3 km || 
|-id=489 bgcolor=#fefefe
| 186489 ||  || — || October 4, 2002 || Socorro || LINEAR || ERI || align=right | 2.3 km || 
|-id=490 bgcolor=#fefefe
| 186490 ||  || — || October 7, 2002 || Socorro || LINEAR || — || align=right | 1.2 km || 
|-id=491 bgcolor=#fefefe
| 186491 ||  || — || October 8, 2002 || Anderson Mesa || LONEOS || — || align=right | 2.9 km || 
|-id=492 bgcolor=#fefefe
| 186492 ||  || — || October 9, 2002 || Anderson Mesa || LONEOS || — || align=right | 1.4 km || 
|-id=493 bgcolor=#fefefe
| 186493 ||  || — || October 10, 2002 || Socorro || LINEAR || — || align=right | 1.2 km || 
|-id=494 bgcolor=#fefefe
| 186494 ||  || — || October 10, 2002 || Palomar || NEAT || NYS || align=right | 2.4 km || 
|-id=495 bgcolor=#fefefe
| 186495 ||  || — || October 10, 2002 || Socorro || LINEAR || V || align=right | 1.5 km || 
|-id=496 bgcolor=#fefefe
| 186496 ||  || — || October 15, 2002 || Palomar || NEAT || FLO || align=right data-sort-value="0.87" | 870 m || 
|-id=497 bgcolor=#fefefe
| 186497 ||  || — || October 15, 2002 || Palomar || NEAT || V || align=right data-sort-value="0.92" | 920 m || 
|-id=498 bgcolor=#fefefe
| 186498 ||  || — || October 11, 2002 || Socorro || LINEAR || — || align=right | 1.2 km || 
|-id=499 bgcolor=#fefefe
| 186499 ||  || — || October 5, 2002 || Apache Point || SDSS || — || align=right | 1.2 km || 
|-id=500 bgcolor=#fefefe
| 186500 ||  || — || October 10, 2002 || Apache Point || SDSS || NYS || align=right data-sort-value="0.66" | 660 m || 
|}

186501–186600 

|-bgcolor=#fefefe
| 186501 || 2002 UY || — || October 25, 2002 || Palomar || NEAT || — || align=right | 1.6 km || 
|-id=502 bgcolor=#fefefe
| 186502 ||  || — || October 28, 2002 || Palomar || NEAT || V || align=right | 1.0 km || 
|-id=503 bgcolor=#fefefe
| 186503 ||  || — || October 30, 2002 || Palomar || NEAT || — || align=right | 1.2 km || 
|-id=504 bgcolor=#fefefe
| 186504 ||  || — || October 30, 2002 || Palomar || NEAT || — || align=right | 1.3 km || 
|-id=505 bgcolor=#fefefe
| 186505 ||  || — || October 30, 2002 || Palomar || NEAT || — || align=right | 1.2 km || 
|-id=506 bgcolor=#fefefe
| 186506 ||  || — || October 30, 2002 || Palomar || NEAT || V || align=right | 1.3 km || 
|-id=507 bgcolor=#fefefe
| 186507 ||  || — || October 29, 2002 || Apache Point || SDSS || V || align=right data-sort-value="0.75" | 750 m || 
|-id=508 bgcolor=#fefefe
| 186508 ||  || — || October 29, 2002 || Apache Point || SDSS || FLO || align=right data-sort-value="0.92" | 920 m || 
|-id=509 bgcolor=#fefefe
| 186509 ||  || — || November 2, 2002 || Haleakala || NEAT || V || align=right | 1.0 km || 
|-id=510 bgcolor=#fefefe
| 186510 ||  || — || November 1, 2002 || Palomar || NEAT || — || align=right | 1.4 km || 
|-id=511 bgcolor=#fefefe
| 186511 ||  || — || November 2, 2002 || Palomar || NEAT || NYS || align=right | 1.3 km || 
|-id=512 bgcolor=#fefefe
| 186512 ||  || — || November 5, 2002 || Socorro || LINEAR || NYS || align=right data-sort-value="0.91" | 910 m || 
|-id=513 bgcolor=#E9E9E9
| 186513 ||  || — || November 5, 2002 || Socorro || LINEAR || — || align=right | 1.4 km || 
|-id=514 bgcolor=#fefefe
| 186514 ||  || — || November 5, 2002 || Socorro || LINEAR || NYS || align=right data-sort-value="0.97" | 970 m || 
|-id=515 bgcolor=#fefefe
| 186515 ||  || — || November 5, 2002 || Socorro || LINEAR || NYS || align=right data-sort-value="0.92" | 920 m || 
|-id=516 bgcolor=#fefefe
| 186516 ||  || — || November 5, 2002 || Socorro || LINEAR || — || align=right | 1.5 km || 
|-id=517 bgcolor=#E9E9E9
| 186517 ||  || — || November 5, 2002 || Socorro || LINEAR || — || align=right | 1.3 km || 
|-id=518 bgcolor=#fefefe
| 186518 ||  || — || November 5, 2002 || Kitt Peak || Spacewatch || NYS || align=right | 1.1 km || 
|-id=519 bgcolor=#fefefe
| 186519 ||  || — || November 5, 2002 || Socorro || LINEAR || V || align=right | 1.2 km || 
|-id=520 bgcolor=#fefefe
| 186520 ||  || — || November 5, 2002 || Socorro || LINEAR || — || align=right | 1.6 km || 
|-id=521 bgcolor=#fefefe
| 186521 ||  || — || November 4, 2002 || Palomar || NEAT || — || align=right | 1.2 km || 
|-id=522 bgcolor=#E9E9E9
| 186522 ||  || — || November 5, 2002 || Socorro || LINEAR || MIT || align=right | 3.9 km || 
|-id=523 bgcolor=#fefefe
| 186523 ||  || — || November 5, 2002 || Anderson Mesa || LONEOS || — || align=right | 1.3 km || 
|-id=524 bgcolor=#fefefe
| 186524 ||  || — || November 6, 2002 || Anderson Mesa || LONEOS || — || align=right | 1.3 km || 
|-id=525 bgcolor=#fefefe
| 186525 ||  || — || November 6, 2002 || Anderson Mesa || LONEOS || V || align=right | 1.2 km || 
|-id=526 bgcolor=#fefefe
| 186526 ||  || — || November 6, 2002 || Anderson Mesa || LONEOS || — || align=right | 1.8 km || 
|-id=527 bgcolor=#fefefe
| 186527 ||  || — || November 3, 2002 || Haleakala || NEAT || FLO || align=right | 2.1 km || 
|-id=528 bgcolor=#fefefe
| 186528 ||  || — || November 7, 2002 || Socorro || LINEAR || — || align=right | 2.7 km || 
|-id=529 bgcolor=#fefefe
| 186529 ||  || — || November 7, 2002 || Socorro || LINEAR || MAS || align=right | 1.3 km || 
|-id=530 bgcolor=#fefefe
| 186530 ||  || — || November 7, 2002 || Socorro || LINEAR || CLA || align=right | 3.0 km || 
|-id=531 bgcolor=#fefefe
| 186531 ||  || — || November 7, 2002 || Socorro || LINEAR || V || align=right data-sort-value="0.94" | 940 m || 
|-id=532 bgcolor=#E9E9E9
| 186532 ||  || — || November 7, 2002 || Socorro || LINEAR || — || align=right | 1.7 km || 
|-id=533 bgcolor=#E9E9E9
| 186533 ||  || — || November 8, 2002 || Socorro || LINEAR || — || align=right | 1.5 km || 
|-id=534 bgcolor=#fefefe
| 186534 ||  || — || November 11, 2002 || Anderson Mesa || LONEOS || — || align=right | 1.6 km || 
|-id=535 bgcolor=#E9E9E9
| 186535 ||  || — || November 11, 2002 || Socorro || LINEAR || — || align=right | 1.7 km || 
|-id=536 bgcolor=#fefefe
| 186536 ||  || — || November 12, 2002 || Socorro || LINEAR || SUL || align=right | 3.3 km || 
|-id=537 bgcolor=#E9E9E9
| 186537 ||  || — || November 12, 2002 || Socorro || LINEAR || — || align=right | 2.3 km || 
|-id=538 bgcolor=#fefefe
| 186538 ||  || — || November 12, 2002 || Socorro || LINEAR || — || align=right | 1.4 km || 
|-id=539 bgcolor=#fefefe
| 186539 ||  || — || November 13, 2002 || Palomar || NEAT || NYS || align=right | 2.7 km || 
|-id=540 bgcolor=#fefefe
| 186540 ||  || — || November 15, 2002 || Socorro || LINEAR || NYS || align=right | 1.1 km || 
|-id=541 bgcolor=#fefefe
| 186541 ||  || — || November 23, 2002 || Palomar || NEAT || V || align=right | 1.2 km || 
|-id=542 bgcolor=#fefefe
| 186542 ||  || — || November 25, 2002 || Palomar || NEAT || V || align=right | 1.3 km || 
|-id=543 bgcolor=#fefefe
| 186543 ||  || — || November 28, 2002 || Anderson Mesa || LONEOS || V || align=right | 1.0 km || 
|-id=544 bgcolor=#C2FFFF
| 186544 ||  || — || November 24, 2002 || Palomar || NEAT || L5 || align=right | 12 km || 
|-id=545 bgcolor=#E9E9E9
| 186545 ||  || — || December 2, 2002 || Socorro || LINEAR || — || align=right data-sort-value="0.95" | 950 m || 
|-id=546 bgcolor=#fefefe
| 186546 ||  || — || December 1, 2002 || Haleakala || NEAT || MAS || align=right | 1.3 km || 
|-id=547 bgcolor=#fefefe
| 186547 ||  || — || December 2, 2002 || Socorro || LINEAR || NYS || align=right data-sort-value="0.99" | 990 m || 
|-id=548 bgcolor=#fefefe
| 186548 ||  || — || December 2, 2002 || Socorro || LINEAR || MAS || align=right | 1.2 km || 
|-id=549 bgcolor=#fefefe
| 186549 ||  || — || December 2, 2002 || Socorro || LINEAR || CLA || align=right | 2.8 km || 
|-id=550 bgcolor=#E9E9E9
| 186550 ||  || — || December 3, 2002 || Palomar || NEAT || — || align=right | 2.4 km || 
|-id=551 bgcolor=#E9E9E9
| 186551 ||  || — || December 3, 2002 || Palomar || NEAT || MIT || align=right | 3.4 km || 
|-id=552 bgcolor=#fefefe
| 186552 ||  || — || December 3, 2002 || Haleakala || NEAT || V || align=right | 1.3 km || 
|-id=553 bgcolor=#fefefe
| 186553 ||  || — || December 5, 2002 || Socorro || LINEAR || MAS || align=right data-sort-value="0.98" | 980 m || 
|-id=554 bgcolor=#E9E9E9
| 186554 ||  || — || December 5, 2002 || Socorro || LINEAR || — || align=right | 1.3 km || 
|-id=555 bgcolor=#E9E9E9
| 186555 ||  || — || December 6, 2002 || Socorro || LINEAR || — || align=right | 1.7 km || 
|-id=556 bgcolor=#fefefe
| 186556 ||  || — || December 10, 2002 || Socorro || LINEAR || — || align=right | 1.8 km || 
|-id=557 bgcolor=#E9E9E9
| 186557 ||  || — || December 10, 2002 || Palomar || NEAT || — || align=right | 1.6 km || 
|-id=558 bgcolor=#E9E9E9
| 186558 ||  || — || December 5, 2002 || Socorro || LINEAR || MAR || align=right | 1.6 km || 
|-id=559 bgcolor=#E9E9E9
| 186559 ||  || — || December 27, 2002 || Anderson Mesa || LONEOS || JUN || align=right | 2.4 km || 
|-id=560 bgcolor=#E9E9E9
| 186560 ||  || — || December 28, 2002 || Anderson Mesa || LONEOS || — || align=right | 2.0 km || 
|-id=561 bgcolor=#E9E9E9
| 186561 ||  || — || December 28, 2002 || Kitt Peak || Spacewatch || — || align=right | 2.1 km || 
|-id=562 bgcolor=#E9E9E9
| 186562 ||  || — || December 31, 2002 || Socorro || LINEAR || — || align=right | 2.1 km || 
|-id=563 bgcolor=#E9E9E9
| 186563 ||  || — || December 31, 2002 || Socorro || LINEAR || — || align=right | 1.8 km || 
|-id=564 bgcolor=#E9E9E9
| 186564 ||  || — || December 31, 2002 || Socorro || LINEAR || — || align=right | 1.2 km || 
|-id=565 bgcolor=#E9E9E9
| 186565 ||  || — || December 31, 2002 || Socorro || LINEAR || — || align=right | 1.6 km || 
|-id=566 bgcolor=#E9E9E9
| 186566 ||  || — || December 31, 2002 || Socorro || LINEAR || — || align=right | 2.3 km || 
|-id=567 bgcolor=#E9E9E9
| 186567 ||  || — || December 31, 2002 || Socorro || LINEAR || — || align=right | 1.9 km || 
|-id=568 bgcolor=#E9E9E9
| 186568 ||  || — || December 31, 2002 || Socorro || LINEAR || — || align=right | 1.6 km || 
|-id=569 bgcolor=#E9E9E9
| 186569 ||  || — || December 31, 2002 || Socorro || LINEAR || — || align=right | 2.3 km || 
|-id=570 bgcolor=#E9E9E9
| 186570 ||  || — || December 31, 2002 || Socorro || LINEAR || — || align=right | 2.0 km || 
|-id=571 bgcolor=#E9E9E9
| 186571 ||  || — || January 2, 2003 || Socorro || LINEAR || — || align=right | 1.9 km || 
|-id=572 bgcolor=#E9E9E9
| 186572 ||  || — || January 1, 2003 || Socorro || LINEAR || EUN || align=right | 2.0 km || 
|-id=573 bgcolor=#fefefe
| 186573 ||  || — || January 5, 2003 || Socorro || LINEAR || — || align=right | 1.5 km || 
|-id=574 bgcolor=#E9E9E9
| 186574 ||  || — || January 7, 2003 || Socorro || LINEAR || — || align=right | 5.2 km || 
|-id=575 bgcolor=#fefefe
| 186575 ||  || — || January 5, 2003 || Socorro || LINEAR || — || align=right | 1.8 km || 
|-id=576 bgcolor=#E9E9E9
| 186576 ||  || — || January 5, 2003 || Socorro || LINEAR || — || align=right | 2.0 km || 
|-id=577 bgcolor=#E9E9E9
| 186577 ||  || — || January 5, 2003 || Socorro || LINEAR || — || align=right | 1.6 km || 
|-id=578 bgcolor=#E9E9E9
| 186578 ||  || — || January 5, 2003 || Socorro || LINEAR || — || align=right | 2.1 km || 
|-id=579 bgcolor=#E9E9E9
| 186579 ||  || — || January 5, 2003 || Socorro || LINEAR || — || align=right | 3.5 km || 
|-id=580 bgcolor=#E9E9E9
| 186580 ||  || — || January 8, 2003 || Socorro || LINEAR || — || align=right | 2.8 km || 
|-id=581 bgcolor=#E9E9E9
| 186581 ||  || — || January 9, 2003 || Socorro || LINEAR || — || align=right | 1.8 km || 
|-id=582 bgcolor=#E9E9E9
| 186582 ||  || — || January 7, 2003 || Socorro || LINEAR || — || align=right | 2.5 km || 
|-id=583 bgcolor=#E9E9E9
| 186583 ||  || — || January 7, 2003 || Socorro || LINEAR || — || align=right | 4.6 km || 
|-id=584 bgcolor=#E9E9E9
| 186584 ||  || — || January 8, 2003 || Socorro || LINEAR || MIS || align=right | 3.5 km || 
|-id=585 bgcolor=#E9E9E9
| 186585 ||  || — || January 10, 2003 || Socorro || LINEAR || — || align=right | 4.0 km || 
|-id=586 bgcolor=#E9E9E9
| 186586 ||  || — || January 10, 2003 || Socorro || LINEAR || — || align=right | 3.1 km || 
|-id=587 bgcolor=#E9E9E9
| 186587 ||  || — || January 12, 2003 || Socorro || LINEAR || — || align=right | 3.9 km || 
|-id=588 bgcolor=#fefefe
| 186588 ||  || — || January 8, 2003 || Socorro || LINEAR || LCI || align=right | 1.6 km || 
|-id=589 bgcolor=#E9E9E9
| 186589 ||  || — || January 25, 2003 || Palomar || NEAT || CLO || align=right | 3.4 km || 
|-id=590 bgcolor=#E9E9E9
| 186590 ||  || — || January 27, 2003 || Socorro || LINEAR || — || align=right | 2.9 km || 
|-id=591 bgcolor=#E9E9E9
| 186591 ||  || — || January 25, 2003 || Palomar || NEAT || — || align=right | 2.2 km || 
|-id=592 bgcolor=#fefefe
| 186592 ||  || — || January 25, 2003 || Palomar || NEAT || H || align=right | 1.0 km || 
|-id=593 bgcolor=#E9E9E9
| 186593 ||  || — || January 26, 2003 || Palomar || NEAT || — || align=right | 1.8 km || 
|-id=594 bgcolor=#E9E9E9
| 186594 ||  || — || January 28, 2003 || Palomar || NEAT || — || align=right | 3.3 km || 
|-id=595 bgcolor=#E9E9E9
| 186595 ||  || — || January 27, 2003 || Socorro || LINEAR || MAR || align=right | 1.8 km || 
|-id=596 bgcolor=#E9E9E9
| 186596 ||  || — || January 27, 2003 || Socorro || LINEAR || — || align=right | 2.9 km || 
|-id=597 bgcolor=#E9E9E9
| 186597 ||  || — || January 28, 2003 || Palomar || NEAT || — || align=right | 2.8 km || 
|-id=598 bgcolor=#E9E9E9
| 186598 ||  || — || January 30, 2003 || Anderson Mesa || LONEOS || — || align=right | 2.0 km || 
|-id=599 bgcolor=#fefefe
| 186599 ||  || — || January 28, 2003 || Socorro || LINEAR || — || align=right | 1.9 km || 
|-id=600 bgcolor=#E9E9E9
| 186600 ||  || — || January 31, 2003 || Socorro || LINEAR || — || align=right | 3.0 km || 
|}

186601–186700 

|-bgcolor=#E9E9E9
| 186601 ||  || — || January 25, 2003 || Socorro || LINEAR || EUN || align=right | 1.6 km || 
|-id=602 bgcolor=#E9E9E9
| 186602 ||  || — || January 28, 2003 || Socorro || LINEAR || — || align=right | 4.4 km || 
|-id=603 bgcolor=#E9E9E9
| 186603 ||  || — || January 28, 2003 || Socorro || LINEAR || — || align=right | 3.8 km || 
|-id=604 bgcolor=#E9E9E9
| 186604 ||  || — || January 28, 2003 || Apache Point || SDSS || DOR || align=right | 3.0 km || 
|-id=605 bgcolor=#E9E9E9
| 186605 ||  || — || February 1, 2003 || Palomar || NEAT || — || align=right | 5.4 km || 
|-id=606 bgcolor=#E9E9E9
| 186606 ||  || — || February 4, 2003 || Socorro || LINEAR || — || align=right | 2.2 km || 
|-id=607 bgcolor=#E9E9E9
| 186607 ||  || — || February 4, 2003 || Palomar || NEAT || — || align=right | 4.2 km || 
|-id=608 bgcolor=#d6d6d6
| 186608 ||  || — || February 8, 2003 || Socorro || LINEAR || — || align=right | 5.9 km || 
|-id=609 bgcolor=#E9E9E9
| 186609 ||  || — || February 28, 2003 || Socorro || LINEAR || — || align=right | 4.2 km || 
|-id=610 bgcolor=#E9E9E9
| 186610 ||  || — || March 6, 2003 || Anderson Mesa || LONEOS || PAD || align=right | 2.7 km || 
|-id=611 bgcolor=#E9E9E9
| 186611 ||  || — || March 7, 2003 || Palomar || NEAT || AER || align=right | 2.1 km || 
|-id=612 bgcolor=#E9E9E9
| 186612 ||  || — || March 6, 2003 || Socorro || LINEAR || — || align=right | 4.0 km || 
|-id=613 bgcolor=#E9E9E9
| 186613 ||  || — || March 6, 2003 || Anderson Mesa || LONEOS || — || align=right | 3.7 km || 
|-id=614 bgcolor=#E9E9E9
| 186614 ||  || — || March 7, 2003 || Socorro || LINEAR || — || align=right | 2.9 km || 
|-id=615 bgcolor=#E9E9E9
| 186615 ||  || — || March 7, 2003 || Socorro || LINEAR || — || align=right | 4.9 km || 
|-id=616 bgcolor=#d6d6d6
| 186616 ||  || — || March 8, 2003 || Socorro || LINEAR || THB || align=right | 4.2 km || 
|-id=617 bgcolor=#E9E9E9
| 186617 ||  || — || March 11, 2003 || Palomar || NEAT || XIZ || align=right | 1.9 km || 
|-id=618 bgcolor=#E9E9E9
| 186618 ||  || — || March 11, 2003 || Kitt Peak || Spacewatch || DOR || align=right | 3.4 km || 
|-id=619 bgcolor=#E9E9E9
| 186619 ||  || — || March 23, 2003 || Kitt Peak || Spacewatch || HOF || align=right | 3.5 km || 
|-id=620 bgcolor=#fefefe
| 186620 ||  || — || March 23, 2003 || Kitt Peak || Spacewatch || H || align=right data-sort-value="0.98" | 980 m || 
|-id=621 bgcolor=#E9E9E9
| 186621 ||  || — || March 25, 2003 || Palomar || NEAT || — || align=right | 3.4 km || 
|-id=622 bgcolor=#d6d6d6
| 186622 ||  || — || March 24, 2003 || Kitt Peak || Spacewatch || CHA || align=right | 2.9 km || 
|-id=623 bgcolor=#E9E9E9
| 186623 ||  || — || March 25, 2003 || Palomar || NEAT || CLO || align=right | 4.2 km || 
|-id=624 bgcolor=#d6d6d6
| 186624 ||  || — || March 30, 2003 || Kitt Peak || Spacewatch || — || align=right | 4.1 km || 
|-id=625 bgcolor=#d6d6d6
| 186625 ||  || — || March 24, 2003 || Kitt Peak || Spacewatch || BRA || align=right | 2.3 km || 
|-id=626 bgcolor=#E9E9E9
| 186626 ||  || — || March 26, 2003 || Palomar || NEAT || — || align=right | 4.0 km || 
|-id=627 bgcolor=#d6d6d6
| 186627 ||  || — || March 31, 2003 || Anderson Mesa || LONEOS || URS || align=right | 5.8 km || 
|-id=628 bgcolor=#d6d6d6
| 186628 ||  || — || March 31, 2003 || Socorro || LINEAR || — || align=right | 4.7 km || 
|-id=629 bgcolor=#E9E9E9
| 186629 ||  || — || March 24, 2003 || Kitt Peak || Spacewatch || — || align=right | 3.3 km || 
|-id=630 bgcolor=#E9E9E9
| 186630 ||  || — || April 6, 2003 || Anderson Mesa || LONEOS || — || align=right | 3.2 km || 
|-id=631 bgcolor=#d6d6d6
| 186631 ||  || — || April 9, 2003 || Palomar || NEAT || BRA || align=right | 2.2 km || 
|-id=632 bgcolor=#E9E9E9
| 186632 ||  || — || April 9, 2003 || Palomar || NEAT || PAD || align=right | 3.0 km || 
|-id=633 bgcolor=#E9E9E9
| 186633 ||  || — || April 9, 2003 || Haleakala || NEAT || — || align=right | 2.7 km || 
|-id=634 bgcolor=#d6d6d6
| 186634 ||  || — || April 8, 2003 || Palomar || NEAT || VER || align=right | 5.1 km || 
|-id=635 bgcolor=#d6d6d6
| 186635 ||  || — || April 4, 2003 || Kitt Peak || Spacewatch || EOS || align=right | 3.0 km || 
|-id=636 bgcolor=#d6d6d6
| 186636 ||  || — || April 28, 2003 || Socorro || LINEAR || — || align=right | 6.0 km || 
|-id=637 bgcolor=#fefefe
| 186637 ||  || — || April 21, 2003 || Kitt Peak || Spacewatch || H || align=right data-sort-value="0.64" | 640 m || 
|-id=638 bgcolor=#fefefe
| 186638 ||  || — || May 2, 2003 || Kitt Peak || Spacewatch || H || align=right | 1.2 km || 
|-id=639 bgcolor=#d6d6d6
| 186639 ||  || — || May 23, 2003 || Kitt Peak || Spacewatch || — || align=right | 5.3 km || 
|-id=640 bgcolor=#d6d6d6
| 186640 ||  || — || May 27, 2003 || Haleakala || NEAT || — || align=right | 4.9 km || 
|-id=641 bgcolor=#d6d6d6
| 186641 ||  || — || June 3, 2003 || Socorro || LINEAR || — || align=right | 5.0 km || 
|-id=642 bgcolor=#d6d6d6
| 186642 ||  || — || June 29, 2003 || Socorro || LINEAR || — || align=right | 6.0 km || 
|-id=643 bgcolor=#d6d6d6
| 186643 ||  || — || June 28, 2003 || Prescott || P. G. Comba || — || align=right | 4.2 km || 
|-id=644 bgcolor=#d6d6d6
| 186644 ||  || — || June 28, 2003 || Socorro || LINEAR || — || align=right | 5.7 km || 
|-id=645 bgcolor=#d6d6d6
| 186645 ||  || — || July 10, 2003 || Reedy Creek || J. Broughton || — || align=right | 3.7 km || 
|-id=646 bgcolor=#d6d6d6
| 186646 ||  || — || August 23, 2003 || Socorro || LINEAR || HIL || align=right | 8.6 km || 
|-id=647 bgcolor=#d6d6d6
| 186647 ||  || — || September 13, 2003 || Anderson Mesa || LONEOS || — || align=right | 5.0 km || 
|-id=648 bgcolor=#fefefe
| 186648 ||  || — || September 16, 2003 || Socorro || LINEAR || H || align=right data-sort-value="0.89" | 890 m || 
|-id=649 bgcolor=#d6d6d6
| 186649 ||  || — || October 15, 2003 || Anderson Mesa || LONEOS || 3:2 || align=right | 8.9 km || 
|-id=650 bgcolor=#fefefe
| 186650 ||  || — || October 17, 2003 || Kitt Peak || Spacewatch || FLO || align=right data-sort-value="0.84" | 840 m || 
|-id=651 bgcolor=#fefefe
| 186651 ||  || — || October 18, 2003 || Palomar || NEAT || — || align=right | 1.0 km || 
|-id=652 bgcolor=#fefefe
| 186652 ||  || — || October 18, 2003 || Palomar || NEAT || V || align=right data-sort-value="0.81" | 810 m || 
|-id=653 bgcolor=#fefefe
| 186653 ||  || — || October 21, 2003 || Socorro || LINEAR || MAS || align=right | 1.5 km || 
|-id=654 bgcolor=#fefefe
| 186654 ||  || — || November 19, 2003 || Kitt Peak || Spacewatch || — || align=right data-sort-value="0.78" | 780 m || 
|-id=655 bgcolor=#fefefe
| 186655 ||  || — || November 21, 2003 || Socorro || LINEAR || — || align=right data-sort-value="0.95" | 950 m || 
|-id=656 bgcolor=#fefefe
| 186656 ||  || — || November 21, 2003 || Socorro || LINEAR || — || align=right | 1.2 km || 
|-id=657 bgcolor=#fefefe
| 186657 ||  || — || November 21, 2003 || Socorro || LINEAR || — || align=right | 1.2 km || 
|-id=658 bgcolor=#fefefe
| 186658 ||  || — || November 24, 2003 || Kitt Peak || Spacewatch || — || align=right | 1.1 km || 
|-id=659 bgcolor=#fefefe
| 186659 ||  || — || December 14, 2003 || Palomar || NEAT || — || align=right | 1.6 km || 
|-id=660 bgcolor=#fefefe
| 186660 ||  || — || December 14, 2003 || Kitt Peak || Spacewatch || — || align=right data-sort-value="0.93" | 930 m || 
|-id=661 bgcolor=#fefefe
| 186661 ||  || — || December 4, 2003 || Socorro || LINEAR || FLO || align=right data-sort-value="0.86" | 860 m || 
|-id=662 bgcolor=#fefefe
| 186662 ||  || — || December 16, 2003 || Kitt Peak || Spacewatch || NYS || align=right data-sort-value="0.82" | 820 m || 
|-id=663 bgcolor=#fefefe
| 186663 ||  || — || December 16, 2003 || Catalina || CSS || FLO || align=right | 1.1 km || 
|-id=664 bgcolor=#fefefe
| 186664 ||  || — || December 18, 2003 || Uccle || Uccle Obs. || FLO || align=right | 1.0 km || 
|-id=665 bgcolor=#fefefe
| 186665 ||  || — || December 17, 2003 || Kitt Peak || Spacewatch || — || align=right data-sort-value="0.78" | 780 m || 
|-id=666 bgcolor=#fefefe
| 186666 ||  || — || December 19, 2003 || Socorro || LINEAR || — || align=right | 1.3 km || 
|-id=667 bgcolor=#fefefe
| 186667 ||  || — || December 19, 2003 || Socorro || LINEAR || — || align=right | 1.0 km || 
|-id=668 bgcolor=#fefefe
| 186668 ||  || — || December 19, 2003 || Socorro || LINEAR || — || align=right | 1.1 km || 
|-id=669 bgcolor=#fefefe
| 186669 ||  || — || December 18, 2003 || Socorro || LINEAR || — || align=right | 1.3 km || 
|-id=670 bgcolor=#fefefe
| 186670 ||  || — || December 18, 2003 || Socorro || LINEAR || NYS || align=right | 1.1 km || 
|-id=671 bgcolor=#fefefe
| 186671 ||  || — || December 18, 2003 || Socorro || LINEAR || — || align=right | 1.1 km || 
|-id=672 bgcolor=#fefefe
| 186672 ||  || — || December 19, 2003 || Socorro || LINEAR || FLO || align=right data-sort-value="0.99" | 990 m || 
|-id=673 bgcolor=#fefefe
| 186673 ||  || — || December 19, 2003 || Socorro || LINEAR || — || align=right | 1.0 km || 
|-id=674 bgcolor=#fefefe
| 186674 ||  || — || December 23, 2003 || Socorro || LINEAR || — || align=right | 1.2 km || 
|-id=675 bgcolor=#fefefe
| 186675 ||  || — || December 23, 2003 || Socorro || LINEAR || FLO || align=right data-sort-value="0.86" | 860 m || 
|-id=676 bgcolor=#fefefe
| 186676 ||  || — || December 27, 2003 || Kitt Peak || Spacewatch || — || align=right | 1.2 km || 
|-id=677 bgcolor=#fefefe
| 186677 ||  || — || December 27, 2003 || Socorro || LINEAR || — || align=right | 1.4 km || 
|-id=678 bgcolor=#fefefe
| 186678 ||  || — || December 27, 2003 || Socorro || LINEAR || V || align=right | 1.0 km || 
|-id=679 bgcolor=#fefefe
| 186679 ||  || — || December 27, 2003 || Socorro || LINEAR || — || align=right | 1.3 km || 
|-id=680 bgcolor=#fefefe
| 186680 ||  || — || December 27, 2003 || Socorro || LINEAR || — || align=right data-sort-value="0.90" | 900 m || 
|-id=681 bgcolor=#E9E9E9
| 186681 ||  || — || December 28, 2003 || Socorro || LINEAR || — || align=right | 2.1 km || 
|-id=682 bgcolor=#fefefe
| 186682 ||  || — || December 28, 2003 || Socorro || LINEAR || — || align=right | 1.4 km || 
|-id=683 bgcolor=#fefefe
| 186683 ||  || — || December 28, 2003 || Socorro || LINEAR || — || align=right | 1.5 km || 
|-id=684 bgcolor=#fefefe
| 186684 ||  || — || December 20, 2003 || Socorro || LINEAR || — || align=right | 1.0 km || 
|-id=685 bgcolor=#E9E9E9
| 186685 ||  || — || December 18, 2003 || Socorro || LINEAR || — || align=right | 1.7 km || 
|-id=686 bgcolor=#fefefe
| 186686 ||  || — || January 13, 2004 || Anderson Mesa || LONEOS || — || align=right | 1.2 km || 
|-id=687 bgcolor=#fefefe
| 186687 ||  || — || January 15, 2004 || Kitt Peak || Spacewatch || — || align=right data-sort-value="0.98" | 980 m || 
|-id=688 bgcolor=#fefefe
| 186688 ||  || — || January 16, 2004 || Palomar || NEAT || — || align=right | 1.0 km || 
|-id=689 bgcolor=#fefefe
| 186689 ||  || — || January 16, 2004 || Kitt Peak || Spacewatch || — || align=right data-sort-value="0.69" | 690 m || 
|-id=690 bgcolor=#fefefe
| 186690 ||  || — || January 16, 2004 || Palomar || NEAT || — || align=right | 1.5 km || 
|-id=691 bgcolor=#fefefe
| 186691 ||  || — || January 17, 2004 || Palomar || NEAT || FLO || align=right data-sort-value="0.92" | 920 m || 
|-id=692 bgcolor=#fefefe
| 186692 ||  || — || January 17, 2004 || Palomar || NEAT || — || align=right | 1.3 km || 
|-id=693 bgcolor=#fefefe
| 186693 ||  || — || January 16, 2004 || Kitt Peak || Spacewatch || — || align=right | 1.2 km || 
|-id=694 bgcolor=#fefefe
| 186694 ||  || — || January 18, 2004 || Palomar || NEAT || FLO || align=right data-sort-value="0.98" | 980 m || 
|-id=695 bgcolor=#fefefe
| 186695 ||  || — || January 18, 2004 || Palomar || NEAT || NYS || align=right data-sort-value="0.75" | 750 m || 
|-id=696 bgcolor=#fefefe
| 186696 ||  || — || January 19, 2004 || Anderson Mesa || LONEOS || — || align=right | 1.3 km || 
|-id=697 bgcolor=#fefefe
| 186697 ||  || — || January 19, 2004 || Catalina || CSS || — || align=right | 1.3 km || 
|-id=698 bgcolor=#fefefe
| 186698 ||  || — || January 19, 2004 || Catalina || CSS || — || align=right | 1.4 km || 
|-id=699 bgcolor=#E9E9E9
| 186699 ||  || — || January 22, 2004 || Socorro || LINEAR || RAF || align=right | 1.3 km || 
|-id=700 bgcolor=#fefefe
| 186700 ||  || — || January 22, 2004 || Socorro || LINEAR || NYS || align=right | 1.0 km || 
|}

186701–186800 

|-bgcolor=#fefefe
| 186701 ||  || — || January 21, 2004 || Socorro || LINEAR || FLO || align=right data-sort-value="0.95" | 950 m || 
|-id=702 bgcolor=#fefefe
| 186702 ||  || — || January 22, 2004 || Socorro || LINEAR || — || align=right | 1.1 km || 
|-id=703 bgcolor=#fefefe
| 186703 ||  || — || January 22, 2004 || Socorro || LINEAR || NYS || align=right | 1.2 km || 
|-id=704 bgcolor=#fefefe
| 186704 ||  || — || January 24, 2004 || Socorro || LINEAR || — || align=right | 1.0 km || 
|-id=705 bgcolor=#fefefe
| 186705 ||  || — || January 24, 2004 || Socorro || LINEAR || NYS || align=right data-sort-value="0.77" | 770 m || 
|-id=706 bgcolor=#fefefe
| 186706 ||  || — || January 23, 2004 || Socorro || LINEAR || V || align=right | 1.2 km || 
|-id=707 bgcolor=#fefefe
| 186707 ||  || — || January 23, 2004 || Socorro || LINEAR || — || align=right data-sort-value="0.92" | 920 m || 
|-id=708 bgcolor=#fefefe
| 186708 ||  || — || January 23, 2004 || Socorro || LINEAR || ERI || align=right | 1.7 km || 
|-id=709 bgcolor=#fefefe
| 186709 ||  || — || January 25, 2004 || Haleakala || NEAT || — || align=right | 1.2 km || 
|-id=710 bgcolor=#fefefe
| 186710 ||  || — || January 22, 2004 || Socorro || LINEAR || NYS || align=right data-sort-value="0.81" | 810 m || 
|-id=711 bgcolor=#fefefe
| 186711 ||  || — || January 23, 2004 || Socorro || LINEAR || — || align=right | 1.3 km || 
|-id=712 bgcolor=#fefefe
| 186712 ||  || — || January 23, 2004 || Socorro || LINEAR || — || align=right | 1.0 km || 
|-id=713 bgcolor=#fefefe
| 186713 ||  || — || January 23, 2004 || Socorro || LINEAR || — || align=right | 1.3 km || 
|-id=714 bgcolor=#fefefe
| 186714 ||  || — || January 23, 2004 || Socorro || LINEAR || ERI || align=right | 2.3 km || 
|-id=715 bgcolor=#fefefe
| 186715 ||  || — || January 26, 2004 || Anderson Mesa || LONEOS || — || align=right | 1.1 km || 
|-id=716 bgcolor=#fefefe
| 186716 ||  || — || January 28, 2004 || Socorro || LINEAR || — || align=right data-sort-value="0.98" | 980 m || 
|-id=717 bgcolor=#fefefe
| 186717 ||  || — || January 24, 2004 || Socorro || LINEAR || NYS || align=right data-sort-value="0.94" | 940 m || 
|-id=718 bgcolor=#fefefe
| 186718 ||  || — || January 24, 2004 || Socorro || LINEAR || V || align=right | 1.1 km || 
|-id=719 bgcolor=#fefefe
| 186719 ||  || — || January 24, 2004 || Socorro || LINEAR || — || align=right | 1.2 km || 
|-id=720 bgcolor=#fefefe
| 186720 ||  || — || January 26, 2004 || Anderson Mesa || LONEOS || — || align=right | 1.2 km || 
|-id=721 bgcolor=#fefefe
| 186721 ||  || — || January 28, 2004 || Catalina || CSS || FLO || align=right | 1.0 km || 
|-id=722 bgcolor=#fefefe
| 186722 ||  || — || January 28, 2004 || Catalina || CSS || ERI || align=right | 1.9 km || 
|-id=723 bgcolor=#fefefe
| 186723 ||  || — || January 30, 2004 || Socorro || LINEAR || V || align=right | 1.1 km || 
|-id=724 bgcolor=#fefefe
| 186724 ||  || — || January 31, 2004 || Socorro || LINEAR || — || align=right | 1.4 km || 
|-id=725 bgcolor=#fefefe
| 186725 ||  || — || January 18, 2004 || Palomar || NEAT || — || align=right data-sort-value="0.82" | 820 m || 
|-id=726 bgcolor=#fefefe
| 186726 ||  || — || January 22, 2004 || Socorro || LINEAR || — || align=right | 1.3 km || 
|-id=727 bgcolor=#fefefe
| 186727 || 2004 CR || — || February 9, 2004 || Črni Vrh || Črni Vrh || ERI || align=right | 2.5 km || 
|-id=728 bgcolor=#fefefe
| 186728 ||  || — || February 12, 2004 || Wrightwood || J. W. Young || — || align=right | 2.7 km || 
|-id=729 bgcolor=#fefefe
| 186729 ||  || — || February 10, 2004 || Palomar || NEAT || EUT || align=right data-sort-value="0.78" | 780 m || 
|-id=730 bgcolor=#fefefe
| 186730 ||  || — || February 10, 2004 || Palomar || NEAT || — || align=right data-sort-value="0.95" | 950 m || 
|-id=731 bgcolor=#fefefe
| 186731 ||  || — || February 10, 2004 || Palomar || NEAT || FLO || align=right | 1.1 km || 
|-id=732 bgcolor=#fefefe
| 186732 ||  || — || February 11, 2004 || Palomar || NEAT || NYS || align=right data-sort-value="0.87" | 870 m || 
|-id=733 bgcolor=#fefefe
| 186733 ||  || — || February 11, 2004 || Palomar || NEAT || — || align=right | 1.1 km || 
|-id=734 bgcolor=#fefefe
| 186734 ||  || — || February 11, 2004 || Palomar || NEAT || NYS || align=right | 1.1 km || 
|-id=735 bgcolor=#fefefe
| 186735 ||  || — || February 10, 2004 || Palomar || NEAT || V || align=right | 1.1 km || 
|-id=736 bgcolor=#fefefe
| 186736 ||  || — || February 11, 2004 || Kitt Peak || Spacewatch || NYS || align=right data-sort-value="0.82" | 820 m || 
|-id=737 bgcolor=#FA8072
| 186737 ||  || — || February 11, 2004 || Catalina || CSS || — || align=right | 1.1 km || 
|-id=738 bgcolor=#fefefe
| 186738 ||  || — || February 12, 2004 || Palomar || NEAT || — || align=right | 1.7 km || 
|-id=739 bgcolor=#fefefe
| 186739 ||  || — || February 13, 2004 || Jonathan B. Postel || Jonathan B. Postel Obs. || — || align=right data-sort-value="0.96" | 960 m || 
|-id=740 bgcolor=#fefefe
| 186740 ||  || — || February 14, 2004 || Jornada || D. S. Dixon || ERI || align=right | 1.5 km || 
|-id=741 bgcolor=#fefefe
| 186741 ||  || — || February 10, 2004 || Palomar || NEAT || V || align=right | 1.1 km || 
|-id=742 bgcolor=#fefefe
| 186742 ||  || — || February 11, 2004 || Palomar || NEAT || V || align=right | 1.0 km || 
|-id=743 bgcolor=#fefefe
| 186743 ||  || — || February 11, 2004 || Kitt Peak || Spacewatch || — || align=right | 1.1 km || 
|-id=744 bgcolor=#fefefe
| 186744 ||  || — || February 11, 2004 || Kitt Peak || Spacewatch || MAS || align=right data-sort-value="0.68" | 680 m || 
|-id=745 bgcolor=#fefefe
| 186745 ||  || — || February 14, 2004 || Haleakala || NEAT || MAS || align=right | 1.1 km || 
|-id=746 bgcolor=#fefefe
| 186746 ||  || — || February 10, 2004 || Palomar || NEAT || — || align=right | 1.0 km || 
|-id=747 bgcolor=#fefefe
| 186747 ||  || — || February 11, 2004 || Kitt Peak || Spacewatch || FLO || align=right | 1.5 km || 
|-id=748 bgcolor=#fefefe
| 186748 ||  || — || February 15, 2004 || Socorro || LINEAR || — || align=right | 1.1 km || 
|-id=749 bgcolor=#fefefe
| 186749 ||  || — || February 10, 2004 || Catalina || CSS || NYS || align=right data-sort-value="0.83" | 830 m || 
|-id=750 bgcolor=#fefefe
| 186750 ||  || — || February 10, 2004 || Palomar || NEAT || — || align=right | 1.3 km || 
|-id=751 bgcolor=#fefefe
| 186751 ||  || — || February 11, 2004 || Palomar || NEAT || V || align=right data-sort-value="0.95" | 950 m || 
|-id=752 bgcolor=#fefefe
| 186752 ||  || — || February 12, 2004 || Kitt Peak || Spacewatch || — || align=right | 1.2 km || 
|-id=753 bgcolor=#fefefe
| 186753 ||  || — || February 13, 2004 || Kitt Peak || Spacewatch || NYS || align=right | 1.1 km || 
|-id=754 bgcolor=#fefefe
| 186754 ||  || — || February 11, 2004 || Kitt Peak || Spacewatch || NYS || align=right data-sort-value="0.99" | 990 m || 
|-id=755 bgcolor=#fefefe
| 186755 ||  || — || February 11, 2004 || Palomar || NEAT || ERI || align=right | 2.6 km || 
|-id=756 bgcolor=#fefefe
| 186756 ||  || — || February 11, 2004 || Palomar || NEAT || — || align=right | 1.4 km || 
|-id=757 bgcolor=#fefefe
| 186757 ||  || — || February 11, 2004 || Palomar || NEAT || MAS || align=right data-sort-value="0.90" | 900 m || 
|-id=758 bgcolor=#fefefe
| 186758 ||  || — || February 12, 2004 || Palomar || NEAT || — || align=right data-sort-value="0.96" | 960 m || 
|-id=759 bgcolor=#fefefe
| 186759 ||  || — || February 13, 2004 || Kitt Peak || Spacewatch || PHO || align=right | 1.4 km || 
|-id=760 bgcolor=#fefefe
| 186760 ||  || — || February 14, 2004 || Catalina || CSS || — || align=right | 1.5 km || 
|-id=761 bgcolor=#fefefe
| 186761 ||  || — || February 15, 2004 || Catalina || CSS || NYS || align=right | 1.2 km || 
|-id=762 bgcolor=#fefefe
| 186762 ||  || — || February 14, 2004 || Haleakala || NEAT || FLO || align=right | 1.1 km || 
|-id=763 bgcolor=#fefefe
| 186763 ||  || — || February 14, 2004 || Haleakala || NEAT || — || align=right | 1.3 km || 
|-id=764 bgcolor=#fefefe
| 186764 ||  || — || February 12, 2004 || Kitt Peak || Spacewatch || NYS || align=right | 1.0 km || 
|-id=765 bgcolor=#fefefe
| 186765 ||  || — || February 12, 2004 || Kitt Peak || Spacewatch || — || align=right | 1.1 km || 
|-id=766 bgcolor=#fefefe
| 186766 || 2004 DG || — || February 16, 2004 || Desert Eagle || W. K. Y. Yeung || — || align=right | 1.6 km || 
|-id=767 bgcolor=#fefefe
| 186767 ||  || — || February 17, 2004 || Kitt Peak || Spacewatch || NYS || align=right data-sort-value="0.88" | 880 m || 
|-id=768 bgcolor=#fefefe
| 186768 ||  || — || February 17, 2004 || Kitt Peak || Spacewatch || — || align=right | 2.9 km || 
|-id=769 bgcolor=#fefefe
| 186769 ||  || — || February 17, 2004 || Socorro || LINEAR || — || align=right | 1.8 km || 
|-id=770 bgcolor=#fefefe
| 186770 ||  || — || February 18, 2004 || Socorro || LINEAR || MAS || align=right | 1.2 km || 
|-id=771 bgcolor=#fefefe
| 186771 ||  || — || February 18, 2004 || Haleakala || NEAT || V || align=right | 1.3 km || 
|-id=772 bgcolor=#fefefe
| 186772 ||  || — || February 17, 2004 || Socorro || LINEAR || — || align=right | 1.5 km || 
|-id=773 bgcolor=#fefefe
| 186773 ||  || — || February 17, 2004 || Catalina || CSS || — || align=right | 1.3 km || 
|-id=774 bgcolor=#fefefe
| 186774 ||  || — || February 17, 2004 || Catalina || CSS || ERI || align=right | 2.1 km || 
|-id=775 bgcolor=#fefefe
| 186775 ||  || — || February 19, 2004 || Socorro || LINEAR || — || align=right | 1.4 km || 
|-id=776 bgcolor=#fefefe
| 186776 ||  || — || February 18, 2004 || Socorro || LINEAR || — || align=right | 1.8 km || 
|-id=777 bgcolor=#fefefe
| 186777 ||  || — || February 18, 2004 || Socorro || LINEAR || — || align=right | 1.4 km || 
|-id=778 bgcolor=#fefefe
| 186778 ||  || — || February 18, 2004 || Socorro || LINEAR || NYS || align=right data-sort-value="0.90" | 900 m || 
|-id=779 bgcolor=#fefefe
| 186779 ||  || — || February 19, 2004 || Socorro || LINEAR || V || align=right data-sort-value="0.99" | 990 m || 
|-id=780 bgcolor=#fefefe
| 186780 ||  || — || February 18, 2004 || Kitt Peak || Spacewatch || V || align=right data-sort-value="0.94" | 940 m || 
|-id=781 bgcolor=#fefefe
| 186781 ||  || — || February 23, 2004 || Socorro || LINEAR || — || align=right | 1.2 km || 
|-id=782 bgcolor=#fefefe
| 186782 ||  || — || February 19, 2004 || Socorro || LINEAR || — || align=right | 1.4 km || 
|-id=783 bgcolor=#fefefe
| 186783 ||  || — || February 19, 2004 || Socorro || LINEAR || MAS || align=right | 1.3 km || 
|-id=784 bgcolor=#fefefe
| 186784 ||  || — || February 26, 2004 || Goodricke-Pigott || R. A. Tucker || NYS || align=right | 3.1 km || 
|-id=785 bgcolor=#fefefe
| 186785 ||  || — || February 23, 2004 || Socorro || LINEAR || NYS || align=right data-sort-value="0.87" | 870 m || 
|-id=786 bgcolor=#fefefe
| 186786 ||  || — || February 29, 2004 || Kitt Peak || Spacewatch || — || align=right | 1.2 km || 
|-id=787 bgcolor=#fefefe
| 186787 ||  || — || February 29, 2004 || Kitt Peak || Spacewatch || CLA || align=right | 1.8 km || 
|-id=788 bgcolor=#fefefe
| 186788 ||  || — || March 11, 2004 || Palomar || NEAT || MAS || align=right | 1.00 km || 
|-id=789 bgcolor=#fefefe
| 186789 ||  || — || March 13, 2004 || Palomar || NEAT || — || align=right | 1.4 km || 
|-id=790 bgcolor=#E9E9E9
| 186790 ||  || — || March 11, 2004 || Palomar || NEAT || — || align=right | 4.3 km || 
|-id=791 bgcolor=#fefefe
| 186791 ||  || — || March 11, 2004 || Palomar || NEAT || — || align=right | 1.4 km || 
|-id=792 bgcolor=#fefefe
| 186792 ||  || — || March 12, 2004 || Palomar || NEAT || V || align=right | 1.1 km || 
|-id=793 bgcolor=#fefefe
| 186793 ||  || — || March 14, 2004 || Palomar || NEAT || V || align=right | 1.2 km || 
|-id=794 bgcolor=#fefefe
| 186794 ||  || — || March 15, 2004 || Socorro || LINEAR || EUT || align=right | 1.0 km || 
|-id=795 bgcolor=#fefefe
| 186795 ||  || — || March 14, 2004 || Kitt Peak || Spacewatch || — || align=right | 1.6 km || 
|-id=796 bgcolor=#fefefe
| 186796 ||  || — || March 14, 2004 || Catalina || CSS || — || align=right | 1.5 km || 
|-id=797 bgcolor=#fefefe
| 186797 ||  || — || March 15, 2004 || Kitt Peak || Spacewatch || MAS || align=right data-sort-value="0.93" | 930 m || 
|-id=798 bgcolor=#fefefe
| 186798 ||  || — || March 15, 2004 || Kitt Peak || Spacewatch || — || align=right | 1.3 km || 
|-id=799 bgcolor=#fefefe
| 186799 ||  || — || March 15, 2004 || Socorro || LINEAR || — || align=right | 1.3 km || 
|-id=800 bgcolor=#fefefe
| 186800 ||  || — || March 15, 2004 || Socorro || LINEAR || NYS || align=right data-sort-value="0.99" | 990 m || 
|}

186801–186900 

|-bgcolor=#E9E9E9
| 186801 ||  || — || March 15, 2004 || Campo Imperatore || CINEOS || — || align=right | 1.3 km || 
|-id=802 bgcolor=#fefefe
| 186802 ||  || — || March 15, 2004 || Socorro || LINEAR || — || align=right | 1.5 km || 
|-id=803 bgcolor=#fefefe
| 186803 ||  || — || March 15, 2004 || Kitt Peak || Spacewatch || — || align=right | 3.1 km || 
|-id=804 bgcolor=#fefefe
| 186804 ||  || — || March 15, 2004 || Palomar || NEAT || — || align=right | 1.5 km || 
|-id=805 bgcolor=#fefefe
| 186805 ||  || — || March 12, 2004 || Palomar || NEAT || — || align=right data-sort-value="0.96" | 960 m || 
|-id=806 bgcolor=#fefefe
| 186806 ||  || — || March 15, 2004 || Socorro || LINEAR || NYS || align=right | 1.2 km || 
|-id=807 bgcolor=#fefefe
| 186807 ||  || — || March 15, 2004 || Socorro || LINEAR || — || align=right | 1.4 km || 
|-id=808 bgcolor=#fefefe
| 186808 ||  || — || March 15, 2004 || Kitt Peak || Spacewatch || MAS || align=right data-sort-value="0.87" | 870 m || 
|-id=809 bgcolor=#fefefe
| 186809 ||  || — || March 15, 2004 || Socorro || LINEAR || — || align=right | 1.3 km || 
|-id=810 bgcolor=#fefefe
| 186810 ||  || — || March 15, 2004 || Socorro || LINEAR || — || align=right | 1.2 km || 
|-id=811 bgcolor=#fefefe
| 186811 ||  || — || March 15, 2004 || Catalina || CSS || MAS || align=right data-sort-value="0.97" | 970 m || 
|-id=812 bgcolor=#fefefe
| 186812 ||  || — || March 14, 2004 || Kitt Peak || Spacewatch || NYS || align=right data-sort-value="0.86" | 860 m || 
|-id=813 bgcolor=#fefefe
| 186813 ||  || — || March 16, 2004 || Socorro || LINEAR || MAS || align=right | 1.1 km || 
|-id=814 bgcolor=#E9E9E9
| 186814 ||  || — || March 16, 2004 || Campo Imperatore || CINEOS || — || align=right | 2.2 km || 
|-id=815 bgcolor=#fefefe
| 186815 ||  || — || March 16, 2004 || Socorro || LINEAR || V || align=right | 1.3 km || 
|-id=816 bgcolor=#fefefe
| 186816 ||  || — || March 26, 2004 || Socorro || LINEAR || PHO || align=right | 5.4 km || 
|-id=817 bgcolor=#fefefe
| 186817 ||  || — || March 16, 2004 || Socorro || LINEAR || — || align=right | 1.4 km || 
|-id=818 bgcolor=#fefefe
| 186818 ||  || — || March 17, 2004 || Kitt Peak || Spacewatch || V || align=right | 1.1 km || 
|-id=819 bgcolor=#fefefe
| 186819 ||  || — || March 17, 2004 || Kitt Peak || Spacewatch || NYS || align=right data-sort-value="0.86" | 860 m || 
|-id=820 bgcolor=#fefefe
| 186820 ||  || — || March 17, 2004 || Socorro || LINEAR || — || align=right | 1.3 km || 
|-id=821 bgcolor=#E9E9E9
| 186821 ||  || — || March 17, 2004 || Kitt Peak || Spacewatch || — || align=right | 2.2 km || 
|-id=822 bgcolor=#FFC2E0
| 186822 ||  || — || March 29, 2004 || Kitt Peak || Spacewatch || APO +1km || align=right data-sort-value="0.91" | 910 m || 
|-id=823 bgcolor=#FFC2E0
| 186823 ||  || — || March 31, 2004 || Kitt Peak || Spacewatch || APO || align=right data-sort-value="0.54" | 540 m || 
|-id=824 bgcolor=#fefefe
| 186824 ||  || — || March 16, 2004 || Kitt Peak || Spacewatch || — || align=right | 1.5 km || 
|-id=825 bgcolor=#fefefe
| 186825 ||  || — || March 16, 2004 || Campo Imperatore || CINEOS || NYS || align=right data-sort-value="0.84" | 840 m || 
|-id=826 bgcolor=#fefefe
| 186826 ||  || — || March 17, 2004 || Kitt Peak || Spacewatch || — || align=right | 1.2 km || 
|-id=827 bgcolor=#fefefe
| 186827 ||  || — || March 18, 2004 || Socorro || LINEAR || — || align=right | 1.4 km || 
|-id=828 bgcolor=#fefefe
| 186828 ||  || — || March 19, 2004 || Socorro || LINEAR || NYS || align=right | 1.1 km || 
|-id=829 bgcolor=#fefefe
| 186829 ||  || — || March 18, 2004 || Socorro || LINEAR || ERI || align=right | 3.0 km || 
|-id=830 bgcolor=#fefefe
| 186830 ||  || — || March 19, 2004 || Socorro || LINEAR || V || align=right | 1.4 km || 
|-id=831 bgcolor=#E9E9E9
| 186831 ||  || — || March 19, 2004 || Socorro || LINEAR || — || align=right | 1.4 km || 
|-id=832 bgcolor=#fefefe
| 186832 Mosser ||  ||  || March 17, 2004 || Valmeca || C. Demeautis, D. Matter || NYS || align=right data-sort-value="0.98" | 980 m || 
|-id=833 bgcolor=#fefefe
| 186833 ||  || — || March 18, 2004 || Kitt Peak || Spacewatch || — || align=right | 1.2 km || 
|-id=834 bgcolor=#fefefe
| 186834 ||  || — || March 19, 2004 || Palomar || NEAT || — || align=right | 1.4 km || 
|-id=835 bgcolor=#fefefe
| 186835 Normanspinrad ||  ||  || March 27, 2004 || Saint-Sulpice || B. Christophe || V || align=right data-sort-value="0.92" | 920 m || 
|-id=836 bgcolor=#fefefe
| 186836 ||  || — || March 22, 2004 || Socorro || LINEAR || — || align=right | 1.1 km || 
|-id=837 bgcolor=#E9E9E9
| 186837 ||  || — || March 23, 2004 || Kitt Peak || Spacewatch || — || align=right | 1.4 km || 
|-id=838 bgcolor=#fefefe
| 186838 ||  || — || March 24, 2004 || Anderson Mesa || LONEOS || MAS || align=right | 1.3 km || 
|-id=839 bgcolor=#fefefe
| 186839 ||  || — || March 27, 2004 || Catalina || CSS || — || align=right | 1.6 km || 
|-id=840 bgcolor=#fefefe
| 186840 ||  || — || March 20, 2004 || Siding Spring || SSS || — || align=right | 1.7 km || 
|-id=841 bgcolor=#fefefe
| 186841 ||  || — || March 23, 2004 || Socorro || LINEAR || V || align=right | 1.1 km || 
|-id=842 bgcolor=#fefefe
| 186842 ||  || — || March 27, 2004 || Socorro || LINEAR || MAS || align=right | 1.1 km || 
|-id=843 bgcolor=#fefefe
| 186843 || 2004 GV || — || April 9, 2004 || Siding Spring || SSS || NYS || align=right data-sort-value="0.83" | 830 m || 
|-id=844 bgcolor=#FFC2E0
| 186844 ||  || — || April 11, 2004 || Reedy Creek || J. Broughton || APO +1kmPHA || align=right | 1.2 km || 
|-id=845 bgcolor=#E9E9E9
| 186845 ||  || — || April 12, 2004 || Socorro || LINEAR || BAR || align=right | 2.4 km || 
|-id=846 bgcolor=#E9E9E9
| 186846 ||  || — || April 12, 2004 || Kitt Peak || Spacewatch || — || align=right data-sort-value="0.90" | 900 m || 
|-id=847 bgcolor=#E9E9E9
| 186847 ||  || — || April 11, 2004 || Palomar || NEAT || — || align=right | 1.6 km || 
|-id=848 bgcolor=#fefefe
| 186848 ||  || — || April 12, 2004 || Palomar || NEAT || MAS || align=right | 1.0 km || 
|-id=849 bgcolor=#E9E9E9
| 186849 ||  || — || April 12, 2004 || Palomar || NEAT || — || align=right | 1.7 km || 
|-id=850 bgcolor=#E9E9E9
| 186850 ||  || — || April 13, 2004 || Palomar || NEAT || RAF || align=right data-sort-value="0.97" | 970 m || 
|-id=851 bgcolor=#fefefe
| 186851 ||  || — || April 15, 2004 || Palomar || NEAT || — || align=right | 1.9 km || 
|-id=852 bgcolor=#fefefe
| 186852 ||  || — || April 15, 2004 || Catalina || CSS || — || align=right | 1.6 km || 
|-id=853 bgcolor=#fefefe
| 186853 ||  || — || April 12, 2004 || Catalina || CSS || — || align=right | 2.0 km || 
|-id=854 bgcolor=#fefefe
| 186854 ||  || — || April 14, 2004 || Kitt Peak || Spacewatch || — || align=right | 1.3 km || 
|-id=855 bgcolor=#fefefe
| 186855 ||  || — || April 12, 2004 || Kitt Peak || Spacewatch || — || align=right | 1.2 km || 
|-id=856 bgcolor=#fefefe
| 186856 ||  || — || April 12, 2004 || Palomar || NEAT || NYS || align=right data-sort-value="0.77" | 770 m || 
|-id=857 bgcolor=#fefefe
| 186857 ||  || — || April 12, 2004 || Kitt Peak || Spacewatch || V || align=right | 1.0 km || 
|-id=858 bgcolor=#fefefe
| 186858 ||  || — || April 13, 2004 || Kitt Peak || Spacewatch || — || align=right | 1.4 km || 
|-id=859 bgcolor=#fefefe
| 186859 ||  || — || April 14, 2004 || Kitt Peak || Spacewatch || — || align=right | 1.6 km || 
|-id=860 bgcolor=#E9E9E9
| 186860 ||  || — || April 14, 2004 || Kitt Peak || Spacewatch || — || align=right | 1.1 km || 
|-id=861 bgcolor=#E9E9E9
| 186861 ||  || — || April 14, 2004 || Kitt Peak || Spacewatch || — || align=right | 1.8 km || 
|-id=862 bgcolor=#E9E9E9
| 186862 ||  || — || April 16, 2004 || Kitt Peak || Spacewatch || — || align=right | 1.9 km || 
|-id=863 bgcolor=#E9E9E9
| 186863 ||  || — || April 17, 2004 || Socorro || LINEAR || MIT || align=right | 3.7 km || 
|-id=864 bgcolor=#E9E9E9
| 186864 ||  || — || April 16, 2004 || Kitt Peak || Spacewatch || — || align=right | 1.3 km || 
|-id=865 bgcolor=#E9E9E9
| 186865 ||  || — || April 17, 2004 || Socorro || LINEAR || GERslow || align=right | 2.7 km || 
|-id=866 bgcolor=#E9E9E9
| 186866 ||  || — || April 19, 2004 || Socorro || LINEAR || — || align=right | 1.6 km || 
|-id=867 bgcolor=#E9E9E9
| 186867 ||  || — || April 20, 2004 || Socorro || LINEAR || ADE || align=right | 2.6 km || 
|-id=868 bgcolor=#E9E9E9
| 186868 ||  || — || April 20, 2004 || Socorro || LINEAR || — || align=right | 2.2 km || 
|-id=869 bgcolor=#fefefe
| 186869 ||  || — || April 19, 2004 || Socorro || LINEAR || — || align=right | 1.0 km || 
|-id=870 bgcolor=#E9E9E9
| 186870 ||  || — || April 16, 2004 || Socorro || LINEAR || — || align=right | 1.5 km || 
|-id=871 bgcolor=#E9E9E9
| 186871 ||  || — || April 19, 2004 || Kitt Peak || Spacewatch || — || align=right | 1.3 km || 
|-id=872 bgcolor=#fefefe
| 186872 ||  || — || April 21, 2004 || Socorro || LINEAR || — || align=right | 1.3 km || 
|-id=873 bgcolor=#E9E9E9
| 186873 ||  || — || April 22, 2004 || Kitt Peak || Spacewatch || — || align=right | 2.9 km || 
|-id=874 bgcolor=#E9E9E9
| 186874 ||  || — || April 25, 2004 || Socorro || LINEAR || — || align=right | 2.8 km || 
|-id=875 bgcolor=#E9E9E9
| 186875 ||  || — || April 25, 2004 || Socorro || LINEAR || ADE || align=right | 3.7 km || 
|-id=876 bgcolor=#E9E9E9
| 186876 ||  || — || April 29, 2004 || Haleakala || NEAT || — || align=right | 1.7 km || 
|-id=877 bgcolor=#E9E9E9
| 186877 ||  || — || April 25, 2004 || Socorro || LINEAR || — || align=right | 1.6 km || 
|-id=878 bgcolor=#E9E9E9
| 186878 ||  || — || April 20, 2004 || Socorro || LINEAR || — || align=right | 1.7 km || 
|-id=879 bgcolor=#E9E9E9
| 186879 ||  || — || May 9, 2004 || Kitt Peak || Spacewatch || EUN || align=right | 1.9 km || 
|-id=880 bgcolor=#E9E9E9
| 186880 ||  || — || May 13, 2004 || Kitt Peak || Spacewatch || — || align=right | 3.3 km || 
|-id=881 bgcolor=#E9E9E9
| 186881 ||  || — || May 9, 2004 || Kitt Peak || Spacewatch || — || align=right | 1.5 km || 
|-id=882 bgcolor=#E9E9E9
| 186882 ||  || — || May 10, 2004 || Haleakala || NEAT || RAF || align=right | 1.6 km || 
|-id=883 bgcolor=#E9E9E9
| 186883 ||  || — || May 13, 2004 || Palomar || NEAT || — || align=right | 4.3 km || 
|-id=884 bgcolor=#E9E9E9
| 186884 ||  || — || May 15, 2004 || Socorro || LINEAR || — || align=right | 2.2 km || 
|-id=885 bgcolor=#E9E9E9
| 186885 ||  || — || May 15, 2004 || Siding Spring || SSS || GEF || align=right | 2.2 km || 
|-id=886 bgcolor=#E9E9E9
| 186886 ||  || — || May 15, 2004 || Socorro || LINEAR || — || align=right | 1.7 km || 
|-id=887 bgcolor=#E9E9E9
| 186887 ||  || — || May 15, 2004 || Socorro || LINEAR || ADE || align=right | 2.6 km || 
|-id=888 bgcolor=#E9E9E9
| 186888 ||  || — || May 15, 2004 || Socorro || LINEAR || — || align=right | 2.0 km || 
|-id=889 bgcolor=#E9E9E9
| 186889 ||  || — || May 13, 2004 || Anderson Mesa || LONEOS || — || align=right | 2.3 km || 
|-id=890 bgcolor=#E9E9E9
| 186890 ||  || — || May 14, 2004 || Kitt Peak || Spacewatch || GER || align=right | 2.1 km || 
|-id=891 bgcolor=#E9E9E9
| 186891 ||  || — || May 15, 2004 || Socorro || LINEAR || ADE || align=right | 2.9 km || 
|-id=892 bgcolor=#E9E9E9
| 186892 ||  || — || May 15, 2004 || Socorro || LINEAR || — || align=right | 1.4 km || 
|-id=893 bgcolor=#E9E9E9
| 186893 ||  || — || May 13, 2004 || Kitt Peak || Spacewatch || — || align=right | 2.1 km || 
|-id=894 bgcolor=#E9E9E9
| 186894 ||  || — || May 16, 2004 || Kitt Peak || Spacewatch || — || align=right data-sort-value="0.94" | 940 m || 
|-id=895 bgcolor=#E9E9E9
| 186895 ||  || — || May 16, 2004 || Socorro || LINEAR || — || align=right | 2.0 km || 
|-id=896 bgcolor=#E9E9E9
| 186896 ||  || — || May 18, 2004 || Socorro || LINEAR || EUN || align=right | 2.0 km || 
|-id=897 bgcolor=#E9E9E9
| 186897 ||  || — || May 16, 2004 || Socorro || LINEAR || — || align=right | 1.6 km || 
|-id=898 bgcolor=#E9E9E9
| 186898 ||  || — || May 23, 2004 || Kitt Peak || Spacewatch || MAR || align=right | 1.3 km || 
|-id=899 bgcolor=#E9E9E9
| 186899 ||  || — || May 30, 2004 || Siding Spring || SSS || — || align=right | 4.5 km || 
|-id=900 bgcolor=#E9E9E9
| 186900 ||  || — || June 5, 2004 || Palomar || NEAT || — || align=right | 1.9 km || 
|}

186901–187000 

|-bgcolor=#E9E9E9
| 186901 ||  || — || June 11, 2004 || Kitt Peak || Spacewatch || — || align=right | 1.6 km || 
|-id=902 bgcolor=#E9E9E9
| 186902 ||  || — || June 11, 2004 || Socorro || LINEAR || MIT || align=right | 3.7 km || 
|-id=903 bgcolor=#E9E9E9
| 186903 ||  || — || June 11, 2004 || Socorro || LINEAR || — || align=right | 2.7 km || 
|-id=904 bgcolor=#E9E9E9
| 186904 ||  || — || June 12, 2004 || Socorro || LINEAR || — || align=right | 1.4 km || 
|-id=905 bgcolor=#E9E9E9
| 186905 ||  || — || June 12, 2004 || Socorro || LINEAR || EUN || align=right | 2.0 km || 
|-id=906 bgcolor=#E9E9E9
| 186906 ||  || — || June 11, 2004 || Socorro || LINEAR || GER || align=right | 3.5 km || 
|-id=907 bgcolor=#E9E9E9
| 186907 ||  || — || June 12, 2004 || Socorro || LINEAR || KON || align=right | 3.9 km || 
|-id=908 bgcolor=#E9E9E9
| 186908 ||  || — || June 12, 2004 || Socorro || LINEAR || — || align=right | 2.2 km || 
|-id=909 bgcolor=#E9E9E9
| 186909 ||  || — || June 11, 2004 || Palomar || NEAT || — || align=right | 2.2 km || 
|-id=910 bgcolor=#E9E9E9
| 186910 ||  || — || June 15, 2004 || Kitt Peak || Spacewatch || — || align=right | 4.4 km || 
|-id=911 bgcolor=#E9E9E9
| 186911 ||  || — || June 13, 2004 || Kitt Peak || Spacewatch || — || align=right | 1.8 km || 
|-id=912 bgcolor=#E9E9E9
| 186912 ||  || — || June 17, 2004 || Palomar || NEAT || — || align=right | 3.7 km || 
|-id=913 bgcolor=#E9E9E9
| 186913 ||  || — || June 19, 2004 || Catalina || CSS || EUN || align=right | 1.5 km || 
|-id=914 bgcolor=#E9E9E9
| 186914 ||  || — || July 14, 2004 || Socorro || LINEAR || — || align=right | 2.9 km || 
|-id=915 bgcolor=#E9E9E9
| 186915 ||  || — || July 10, 2004 || Needville || J. Dellinger, M. Eastman || AGN || align=right | 1.6 km || 
|-id=916 bgcolor=#E9E9E9
| 186916 ||  || — || July 14, 2004 || Socorro || LINEAR || GEF || align=right | 2.1 km || 
|-id=917 bgcolor=#E9E9E9
| 186917 ||  || — || July 14, 2004 || Socorro || LINEAR || — || align=right | 3.5 km || 
|-id=918 bgcolor=#d6d6d6
| 186918 ||  || — || August 7, 2004 || Palomar || NEAT || — || align=right | 4.2 km || 
|-id=919 bgcolor=#E9E9E9
| 186919 ||  || — || August 8, 2004 || Socorro || LINEAR || MRX || align=right | 1.6 km || 
|-id=920 bgcolor=#E9E9E9
| 186920 ||  || — || August 9, 2004 || Reedy Creek || J. Broughton || — || align=right | 3.2 km || 
|-id=921 bgcolor=#E9E9E9
| 186921 ||  || — || August 9, 2004 || Socorro || LINEAR || — || align=right | 3.4 km || 
|-id=922 bgcolor=#d6d6d6
| 186922 ||  || — || August 7, 2004 || Palomar || NEAT || 628 || align=right | 2.8 km || 
|-id=923 bgcolor=#E9E9E9
| 186923 ||  || — || August 8, 2004 || Socorro || LINEAR || DOR || align=right | 4.3 km || 
|-id=924 bgcolor=#d6d6d6
| 186924 ||  || — || August 9, 2004 || Socorro || LINEAR || HYG || align=right | 5.3 km || 
|-id=925 bgcolor=#d6d6d6
| 186925 ||  || — || August 9, 2004 || Socorro || LINEAR || — || align=right | 3.4 km || 
|-id=926 bgcolor=#d6d6d6
| 186926 ||  || — || August 5, 2004 || Palomar || NEAT || — || align=right | 6.1 km || 
|-id=927 bgcolor=#d6d6d6
| 186927 ||  || — || August 8, 2004 || Socorro || LINEAR || — || align=right | 3.4 km || 
|-id=928 bgcolor=#d6d6d6
| 186928 ||  || — || August 8, 2004 || Palomar || NEAT || — || align=right | 3.6 km || 
|-id=929 bgcolor=#d6d6d6
| 186929 ||  || — || August 9, 2004 || Socorro || LINEAR || — || align=right | 4.4 km || 
|-id=930 bgcolor=#d6d6d6
| 186930 ||  || — || August 9, 2004 || Anderson Mesa || LONEOS || — || align=right | 3.0 km || 
|-id=931 bgcolor=#d6d6d6
| 186931 ||  || — || August 10, 2004 || Socorro || LINEAR || THM || align=right | 4.5 km || 
|-id=932 bgcolor=#d6d6d6
| 186932 ||  || — || August 10, 2004 || Socorro || LINEAR || — || align=right | 3.6 km || 
|-id=933 bgcolor=#E9E9E9
| 186933 ||  || — || August 10, 2004 || Anderson Mesa || LONEOS || GEF || align=right | 2.1 km || 
|-id=934 bgcolor=#d6d6d6
| 186934 ||  || — || August 12, 2004 || Socorro || LINEAR || — || align=right | 4.6 km || 
|-id=935 bgcolor=#d6d6d6
| 186935 ||  || — || August 15, 2004 || Reedy Creek || J. Broughton || — || align=right | 4.8 km || 
|-id=936 bgcolor=#d6d6d6
| 186936 ||  || — || August 15, 2004 || Siding Spring || SSS || — || align=right | 5.0 km || 
|-id=937 bgcolor=#d6d6d6
| 186937 ||  || — || August 15, 2004 || Palomar || NEAT || — || align=right | 3.8 km || 
|-id=938 bgcolor=#E9E9E9
| 186938 || 2004 QS || — || August 18, 2004 || Pla D'Arguines || R. Ferrando || — || align=right | 2.7 km || 
|-id=939 bgcolor=#d6d6d6
| 186939 ||  || — || August 19, 2004 || Pla D'Arguines || R. Ferrando || KOR || align=right | 2.4 km || 
|-id=940 bgcolor=#d6d6d6
| 186940 ||  || — || August 19, 2004 || Siding Spring || SSS || URS || align=right | 5.7 km || 
|-id=941 bgcolor=#d6d6d6
| 186941 ||  || — || August 21, 2004 || Siding Spring || SSS || — || align=right | 5.1 km || 
|-id=942 bgcolor=#d6d6d6
| 186942 ||  || — || August 21, 2004 || Siding Spring || SSS || EOS || align=right | 6.3 km || 
|-id=943 bgcolor=#E9E9E9
| 186943 ||  || — || August 21, 2004 || Siding Spring || SSS || — || align=right | 3.7 km || 
|-id=944 bgcolor=#d6d6d6
| 186944 ||  || — || August 25, 2004 || Kitt Peak || Spacewatch || — || align=right | 3.4 km || 
|-id=945 bgcolor=#d6d6d6
| 186945 ||  || — || September 4, 2004 || Palomar || NEAT || — || align=right | 4.4 km || 
|-id=946 bgcolor=#d6d6d6
| 186946 ||  || — || September 7, 2004 || Saint-Véran || Saint-Véran Obs. || EOS || align=right | 2.7 km || 
|-id=947 bgcolor=#d6d6d6
| 186947 ||  || — || September 7, 2004 || Socorro || LINEAR || — || align=right | 3.5 km || 
|-id=948 bgcolor=#d6d6d6
| 186948 ||  || — || September 8, 2004 || Socorro || LINEAR || — || align=right | 3.3 km || 
|-id=949 bgcolor=#d6d6d6
| 186949 ||  || — || September 8, 2004 || Socorro || LINEAR || — || align=right | 3.4 km || 
|-id=950 bgcolor=#d6d6d6
| 186950 ||  || — || September 8, 2004 || Socorro || LINEAR || — || align=right | 5.1 km || 
|-id=951 bgcolor=#d6d6d6
| 186951 ||  || — || September 8, 2004 || Socorro || LINEAR || — || align=right | 4.6 km || 
|-id=952 bgcolor=#d6d6d6
| 186952 ||  || — || September 8, 2004 || Socorro || LINEAR || — || align=right | 5.8 km || 
|-id=953 bgcolor=#d6d6d6
| 186953 ||  || — || September 8, 2004 || Socorro || LINEAR || EOS || align=right | 3.7 km || 
|-id=954 bgcolor=#d6d6d6
| 186954 ||  || — || September 8, 2004 || Socorro || LINEAR || VER || align=right | 5.3 km || 
|-id=955 bgcolor=#d6d6d6
| 186955 ||  || — || September 8, 2004 || Socorro || LINEAR || EMA || align=right | 5.3 km || 
|-id=956 bgcolor=#d6d6d6
| 186956 ||  || — || September 8, 2004 || Socorro || LINEAR || — || align=right | 4.9 km || 
|-id=957 bgcolor=#d6d6d6
| 186957 ||  || — || September 8, 2004 || Socorro || LINEAR || EOS || align=right | 3.5 km || 
|-id=958 bgcolor=#d6d6d6
| 186958 ||  || — || September 7, 2004 || Socorro || LINEAR || — || align=right | 7.2 km || 
|-id=959 bgcolor=#d6d6d6
| 186959 ||  || — || September 7, 2004 || Palomar || NEAT || — || align=right | 3.5 km || 
|-id=960 bgcolor=#d6d6d6
| 186960 ||  || — || September 8, 2004 || Palomar || NEAT || — || align=right | 6.4 km || 
|-id=961 bgcolor=#d6d6d6
| 186961 ||  || — || September 9, 2004 || Socorro || LINEAR || HYG || align=right | 3.2 km || 
|-id=962 bgcolor=#d6d6d6
| 186962 ||  || — || September 9, 2004 || Kitt Peak || Spacewatch || — || align=right | 4.5 km || 
|-id=963 bgcolor=#d6d6d6
| 186963 ||  || — || September 8, 2004 || Socorro || LINEAR || — || align=right | 3.3 km || 
|-id=964 bgcolor=#d6d6d6
| 186964 ||  || — || September 8, 2004 || Socorro || LINEAR || — || align=right | 5.8 km || 
|-id=965 bgcolor=#d6d6d6
| 186965 ||  || — || September 8, 2004 || Socorro || LINEAR || EOS || align=right | 3.7 km || 
|-id=966 bgcolor=#d6d6d6
| 186966 ||  || — || September 8, 2004 || Socorro || LINEAR || — || align=right | 4.8 km || 
|-id=967 bgcolor=#d6d6d6
| 186967 ||  || — || September 9, 2004 || Socorro || LINEAR || — || align=right | 4.6 km || 
|-id=968 bgcolor=#d6d6d6
| 186968 ||  || — || September 10, 2004 || Socorro || LINEAR || LIX || align=right | 5.3 km || 
|-id=969 bgcolor=#d6d6d6
| 186969 ||  || — || September 10, 2004 || Socorro || LINEAR || — || align=right | 3.4 km || 
|-id=970 bgcolor=#d6d6d6
| 186970 ||  || — || September 10, 2004 || Socorro || LINEAR || — || align=right | 5.9 km || 
|-id=971 bgcolor=#d6d6d6
| 186971 ||  || — || September 10, 2004 || Socorro || LINEAR || LIX || align=right | 6.5 km || 
|-id=972 bgcolor=#d6d6d6
| 186972 ||  || — || September 10, 2004 || Socorro || LINEAR || — || align=right | 5.4 km || 
|-id=973 bgcolor=#d6d6d6
| 186973 ||  || — || September 10, 2004 || Socorro || LINEAR || — || align=right | 4.8 km || 
|-id=974 bgcolor=#d6d6d6
| 186974 ||  || — || September 10, 2004 || Socorro || LINEAR || — || align=right | 6.5 km || 
|-id=975 bgcolor=#d6d6d6
| 186975 ||  || — || September 11, 2004 || Socorro || LINEAR || URS || align=right | 5.9 km || 
|-id=976 bgcolor=#d6d6d6
| 186976 ||  || — || September 13, 2004 || Socorro || LINEAR || — || align=right | 4.4 km || 
|-id=977 bgcolor=#d6d6d6
| 186977 ||  || — || September 9, 2004 || Socorro || LINEAR || — || align=right | 6.2 km || 
|-id=978 bgcolor=#d6d6d6
| 186978 ||  || — || September 9, 2004 || Anderson Mesa || LONEOS || — || align=right | 3.3 km || 
|-id=979 bgcolor=#d6d6d6
| 186979 ||  || — || September 9, 2004 || Anderson Mesa || LONEOS || — || align=right | 7.0 km || 
|-id=980 bgcolor=#d6d6d6
| 186980 ||  || — || September 10, 2004 || Kitt Peak || Spacewatch || THM || align=right | 3.2 km || 
|-id=981 bgcolor=#d6d6d6
| 186981 ||  || — || September 15, 2004 || Anderson Mesa || LONEOS || EOS || align=right | 3.1 km || 
|-id=982 bgcolor=#d6d6d6
| 186982 ||  || — || September 7, 2004 || Socorro || LINEAR || — || align=right | 7.0 km || 
|-id=983 bgcolor=#d6d6d6
| 186983 ||  || — || September 7, 2004 || Socorro || LINEAR || — || align=right | 5.2 km || 
|-id=984 bgcolor=#d6d6d6
| 186984 ||  || — || September 17, 2004 || Anderson Mesa || LONEOS || EOS || align=right | 3.2 km || 
|-id=985 bgcolor=#d6d6d6
| 186985 ||  || — || September 18, 2004 || Socorro || LINEAR || — || align=right | 7.0 km || 
|-id=986 bgcolor=#E9E9E9
| 186986 ||  || — || September 20, 2004 || Siding Spring || SSS || — || align=right | 4.7 km || 
|-id=987 bgcolor=#d6d6d6
| 186987 ||  || — || September 16, 2004 || Anderson Mesa || LONEOS || — || align=right | 4.3 km || 
|-id=988 bgcolor=#d6d6d6
| 186988 ||  || — || October 2, 2004 || Palomar || NEAT || — || align=right | 5.5 km || 
|-id=989 bgcolor=#d6d6d6
| 186989 ||  || — || October 3, 2004 || Palomar || NEAT || EOS || align=right | 3.4 km || 
|-id=990 bgcolor=#d6d6d6
| 186990 ||  || — || October 5, 2004 || Socorro || LINEAR || — || align=right | 6.3 km || 
|-id=991 bgcolor=#d6d6d6
| 186991 ||  || — || October 6, 2004 || Socorro || LINEAR || Tj (2.99) || align=right | 7.2 km || 
|-id=992 bgcolor=#d6d6d6
| 186992 ||  || — || October 7, 2004 || Palomar || NEAT || — || align=right | 9.0 km || 
|-id=993 bgcolor=#E9E9E9
| 186993 ||  || — || October 6, 2004 || Socorro || LINEAR || — || align=right | 4.7 km || 
|-id=994 bgcolor=#d6d6d6
| 186994 ||  || — || October 10, 2004 || Goodricke-Pigott || Goodricke-Pigott Obs. || — || align=right | 3.5 km || 
|-id=995 bgcolor=#d6d6d6
| 186995 ||  || — || October 5, 2004 || Anderson Mesa || LONEOS || — || align=right | 4.0 km || 
|-id=996 bgcolor=#d6d6d6
| 186996 ||  || — || October 5, 2004 || Anderson Mesa || LONEOS || — || align=right | 5.4 km || 
|-id=997 bgcolor=#E9E9E9
| 186997 ||  || — || October 2, 2004 || Palomar || NEAT || — || align=right | 4.2 km || 
|-id=998 bgcolor=#d6d6d6
| 186998 ||  || — || October 5, 2004 || Kitt Peak || Spacewatch || — || align=right | 3.8 km || 
|-id=999 bgcolor=#d6d6d6
| 186999 ||  || — || October 5, 2004 || Kitt Peak || Spacewatch || LIX || align=right | 6.8 km || 
|-id=000 bgcolor=#d6d6d6
| 187000 ||  || — || October 7, 2004 || Socorro || LINEAR || — || align=right | 4.7 km || 
|}

References

External links 
 Discovery Circumstances: Numbered Minor Planets (185001)–(190000) (IAU Minor Planet Center)

0186